= Gallegos =

Origin
- Origin: Spain
- Region of origin: Galicia

Other names
- Variant form: Gallego (surname)

Gallegos is a Spanish surname. It is a regional name denoting someone from Galicia. Notable people with the surname include:

== People ==
- Alphonse Gallegos (1931–1991), American Catholic bishop
- Antonio Hernández Gallegos (1912−1973), Mexican Catholic bishop
- Benjamín Gallegos Soto (1960–2018), Mexican politician
- Carlos Gallegos (born 1992), Mexican boxer
- Chon Gallegos (1939–2023), American football player
- Daniel Arévalo Gallegos (born 1962), Mexican politician
- Daniela Múñoz Gallegos (born 1984), Mexican tennis player
- David Gallegos (first elected 2012), American politician
- Deborah E. Gallegos, 2005 Chief Investment Officer for New York City
- Doreen Gallegos (first elected 2012), American politician
- Elena Gallegos Rosales (1882–1954), Salvadoran-born First Lady of Costa Rica
- Erinea Garcia Gallegos (1903–2002), American educator and postmistress
- Eva Ramón Gallegos (published ca. 1999–2019), Mexican scientist
- Ezequiel Gallegos (born 1991), Argentine footballer
- Felipe Gallegos (born 1991), Chilean footballer
- Fernando Talaverano Gallegos (1563–1619), Spanish lawyer and colonial administrator
- Giovanny Gallegos (born 1991), Mexican baseball pitcher
- Joaquín Gallegos Lara (1909–1947), Ecuadorian novelist and essayist
- Joe Gallegos (born 1941), American politician
- José Antonio Hurtado Gallegos (born 1955), Mexican politician
- Jose Gallegos (soccer) (born 2001), American soccer player
- José Gallegos y Arnosa (1857–1917), Spanish painter and sculptor
- José Guadalupe Gallegos (1828–1867), American politician and soldier
- José Manuel Gallegos (1815–1875), American Catholic priest and politician
- José Manuel Gallegos Rocafull (1895–1963), Spanish priest and philosopher
- José Rafael Gallegos (1784–1850), Costa Rican head of state
- Justin Gallegos (born 1998/99), American runner with cerebral palsy
- Lucila Gallegos Camarena (born 1961), Mexican politician
- Luis Gallegos (born 1946), Ecuadorian diplomat
- Luisa Gallegos (born 1929), American AAGPBL baseball player
- Margarita Gallegos Soto (born 1962), Mexican politician
- Mario Gallegos Jr. (1950–2012), American politician
- Mariquita Gallegos (born 1940), Argentine singer and actress
- Martin Gallegos (first elected 1994), American politician and chiropractor
- Mary Gallegos (first elected 2002), American politician
- Matías Gallegos (born 1997), Argentine footballer
- Melissa Gallegos (born 1978/79), American football player
- Neveah Gallegos (2004–2007), American murdered by her mother's live-in boyfriend
- Pedro de Répide Gallegos (1853–1947), Spanish writer and journalist
- Ramón Gallegos Nava (born 1959), Mexican psychologist
- Reyna Gallegos, Mexican wrestler who debuted in 1980
- Robert Gallegos (born 1957), American politician
- Rocío Reza Gallegos (born 1968), Mexican politician
- Rodolfo Landeros Gallegos (1931–2001), Mexican politician
- Rómulo Gallegos (1884–1969), Venezuelan novelist and politician
- Sebastián Gallegos (born 1992), Uruguayan footballer
- Sharon Lee Gallegos (1955–1960), American murder victim
- Tony Gallegos (1924–2018), American businessman and politician
- Wenceslao Díaz Gallegos (1834–1895), Chilean scientist and surgeon

== See also ==
- Gallego (surname)
- Gallego (disambiguation)
- Galicia (Spain), place of origin for Gallego, Gallegos and los Gallegos names for "those from Galicia"
- Rómulo Gallegos Prize
