= José Gallegos =

José Gallegos may refer to:

- José Rafael Gallegos (1784–1850), twice president of Costa Rica
- José Manuel Gallegos (1815–1875), delegate to the U.S. Congress from the Territory of New Mexico
- José Guadalupe Gallegos (1828–1867), Hispano New Mexican military leader, county sheriff, rancher and politician
- José Gallegos y Arnosa (1857–1917), Spanish painter and sculptor
- José Luis Gallegos (1880–1942), Spanish shipowner, commercial agent and president of Sevilla FC
- José Manuel Gallegos Rocafull (1895–1963), Spanish priest, theologian and philosopher
- Jose Gallegos (soccer) (born 2001), American soccer player

== See also ==
- José Gallego (disambiguation)
