= Catholicism in the Second Spanish Republic =

1931–1939 religious tensions

Flag of the Second Spanish Republic

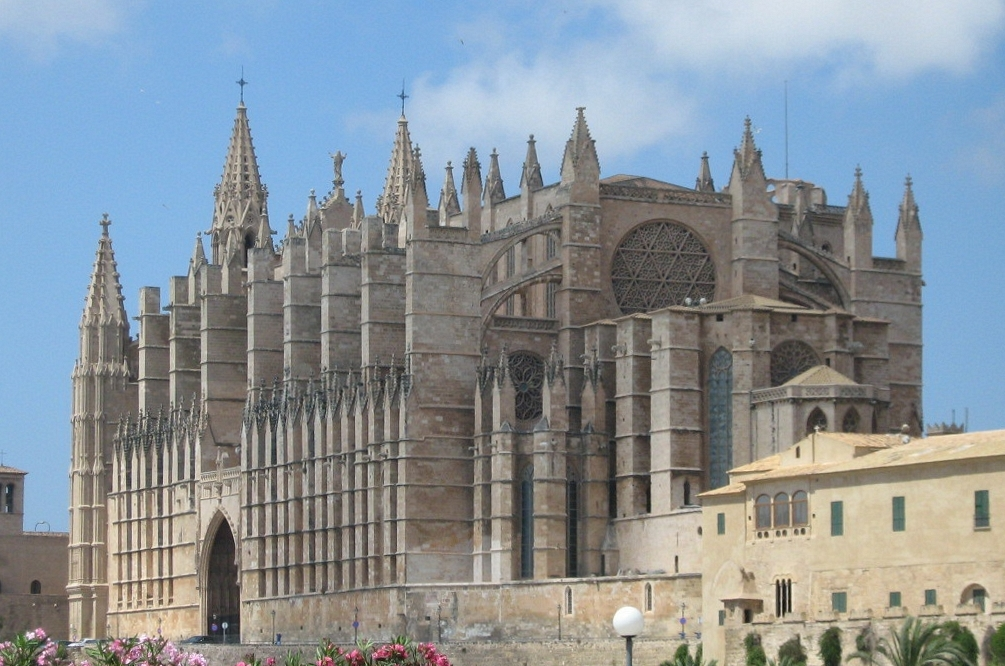
"La Seu" Cathedral of Palma, Majorca

Catholicism in the Second Spanish Republic was an important area of dispute, and tensions between the Catholic hierarchy and the Republic were apparent from the beginning, eventually leading to the Catholic Church acting against the Republic and in collaboration with the regime of Francisco Franco.

The establishment of the Republic began 'the most dramatic phase in the contemporary history of both Spain and the Church.' In the early 1930s, the dispute over the role of the Catholic Church and the rights of Catholics were one of the major issues which worked against the securing of a broad democratic majority and "left the body politic divided almost from the start." The historian Mary Vincent has argued that the Catholic Church was an active element in the polarising politics of the years preceding the Spanish Civil War. Similarly, Frances Lannon asserts that, "Catholic identity has usually been virtually synonymous with conservative politics in some form or other, ranged from extreme authoritarianism through gentler oligarchic tendencies to democratic reformism." The municipal elections of 1931 that triggered the establishment of the Second Spanish Republic and the Spanish Constitution of 1931 "brought to power an anticlerical government." Prime Minister Manuel Azaña asserted that the Catholic Church was responsible in part for what some perceived as Spain's backwardness and advocated the elimination of special privileges for the Church. An admirer of the pre-1914 Third French Republic, he wanted the Second Spanish Republic to emulate it, make secular schooling free and compulsory, and construct a non-religious basis for national culture and citizenship, part of the necessary updating and Europeanising of Spain.

Following elections in June 1931, the new parliament approved an amended constitutional draft on 9 December 1931. The constitution introduced civil marriage and divorce. It also established free, secular education for all. However, anticlerical laws nationalized Church properties and required the Church to pay rent for the use of properties which it had previously owned. In addition, the government forbade public manifestations of Catholicism such as processions on religious feast days, banished the crucifix from schools, and the Jesuits were expelled. Catholic schools continued, but outside the state system, and in 1933 further legislation banned all monks and nuns from teaching.

In May 1931, after monarchist provocations, an outburst of mob violence against the Republic's perceived enemies had led to the burning of churches, convents and religious schools in Madrid and other cities. Anticlerical sentiment and anticlerical legislation, particularly that of 1931, meant that moderate Catholicism quickly became embattled and it was ultimately displaced.

In the election of November 1933, the right-wing CEDA emerged as the largest single party in the new Cortes. President Alcalá-Zamora however asked the Radical leader Alejandro Lerroux to become Spain's Prime Minister.

A general strike and armed rising of workers in October 1934 was forcefully put down by the government. This in turn energized political movements across the spectrum in Spain, including a revived anarchist movement and new reactionary and fascist groups, including the Falange and a revived Carlist movement.

Popular violence which marked the beginning of the Civil War, in the Republican zone saw churches and priests become conspicuous targets, viewed as an ideological enemy, and thirteen bishops and some 7000 clergy—monks and nuns—were killed, nearly all in the first months, and thousands of churches were destroyed. Catholic heartland areas, with the exception of the Basque territory, largely supported Franco's rebel Nationalist forces against the Popular Front government. In parts of Spain, like Navarra for example, the religious-patriotic zeal of priests could be very marked. According to the Benedictine writer Fr Hilari Raguer; "On the outbreak of Spanish Civil War the great majority, that is to say nearly the entire hierarchy of the Spanish Church, and nearly all the prominent among the laity, not only did nothing to restrain the conflict but spurred it on by joining almost en bloc one of the two sides, the side that ended by being the victor, and by demonizing whoever was working for peace. The Spanish Church [-] heated up the atmosphere before it started and added fuel to the flames afterwards."

== Background ==
Spain entered the 20th century a predominantly agrarian nation – a nation which, moreover, had lost its colonies. It was marked by uneven social and cultural development between town and country, between regions, within classes. 'Spain was not one country but a number of countries and regions marked by their uneven historical development.' From the turn of the 20th century, however, there had been a significant advance in industrial development. Between 1910 and 1930, the industrial working class more than doubled to over 2,500,000. Those engaged in agriculture fell from 66 per cent to 45 per cent in the same period. The coalition hoped to concentrate its major reforms on three sectors: the 'latifundist aristocracy', the church and the army – though the attempt would come at a moment of world economic crisis. In the south, less than 2 per cent of all landowners had over two-thirds of the land, while 750,000 labourers eked out a living on near starvation wages. The country was 'prone to centrifugal tendencies', for example there was a tension between Catalan and Basque nationalist sentiment away from an agrarian and centralist ruling class in Madrid. Moreover, whilst all Spain was Catholic by formal definition, in practice Catholic identity varied, affected by factors that ranged from region, to social strata, to the ownership of property, to age, and sex. General patterns were ones of higher levels of Catholic practice throughout much of the north and low levels in the south - ("the very regions of the final expulsion of the Moors and Catholic reconquest in the 15th century seems never to have been truly conquered for the Church."), and higher levels of Catholic practice amongst peasant smallholders than landless peasant labourers. Further, "the urban proletariat of Madrid, or Barcelona, or Bilbao, or Valencia, or Seville or the mining centres of the Asturias rarely entered a church ..the Church and its affairs were simply alien to urban working-class culture. As Canon Arboleya put it in his famous analysis in 1933, the dimensions of the problem were those of mass apostasy, especially among the urban working classes."

Spanish Catholics participated in an enormous number of religious rites quite separate from the minimal obligations of orthodoxy - (church on Sundays, the sacraments) - processions and devotions connected with statues and shrines, for example. Like the rosary and novenas, these were lay rather than sacerdotal forms of worship. In some public religious rituals, the question of whether the ritual was primarily religious or political became an issue. The Jesuit campaign to spread the devotion of the Sacred Heart was " inextricably linked in the early 20th century with the integrist values of the extreme Right of the Catholic political spectrum." Its publication the Messenger of the Sacred Heart was anti-liberal, nationalist and enthusiastic to see 'the social reign of Jesus Christ in Spain.' It campaigned for the enthronement of the Sacred Heart in offices, schools, banks, town halls, and city streets. Statues were erected in hundreds of towns and villages. Seen as symbols of Catholic conservative intolerance, the statues were 'executed' by some anarchists and socialists in the early months of the Spanish Civil War in 1936.

== The Second Republic ==
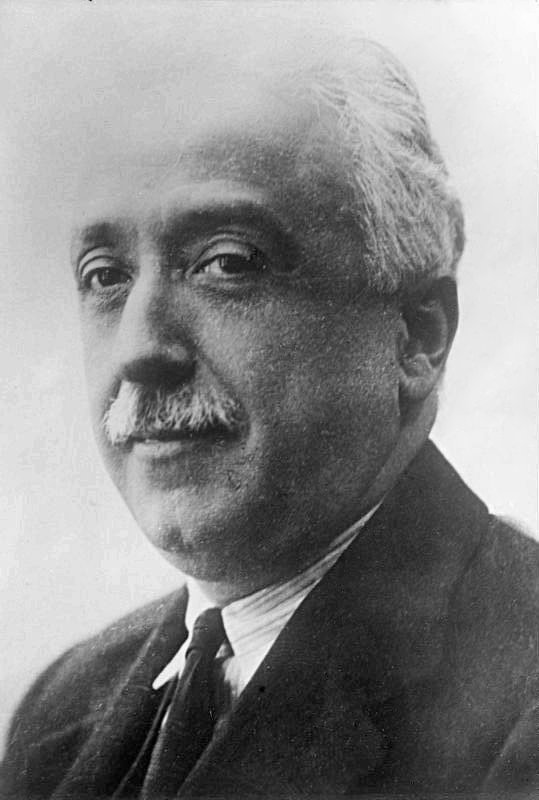
Niceto Alcalá Zamora in 1931

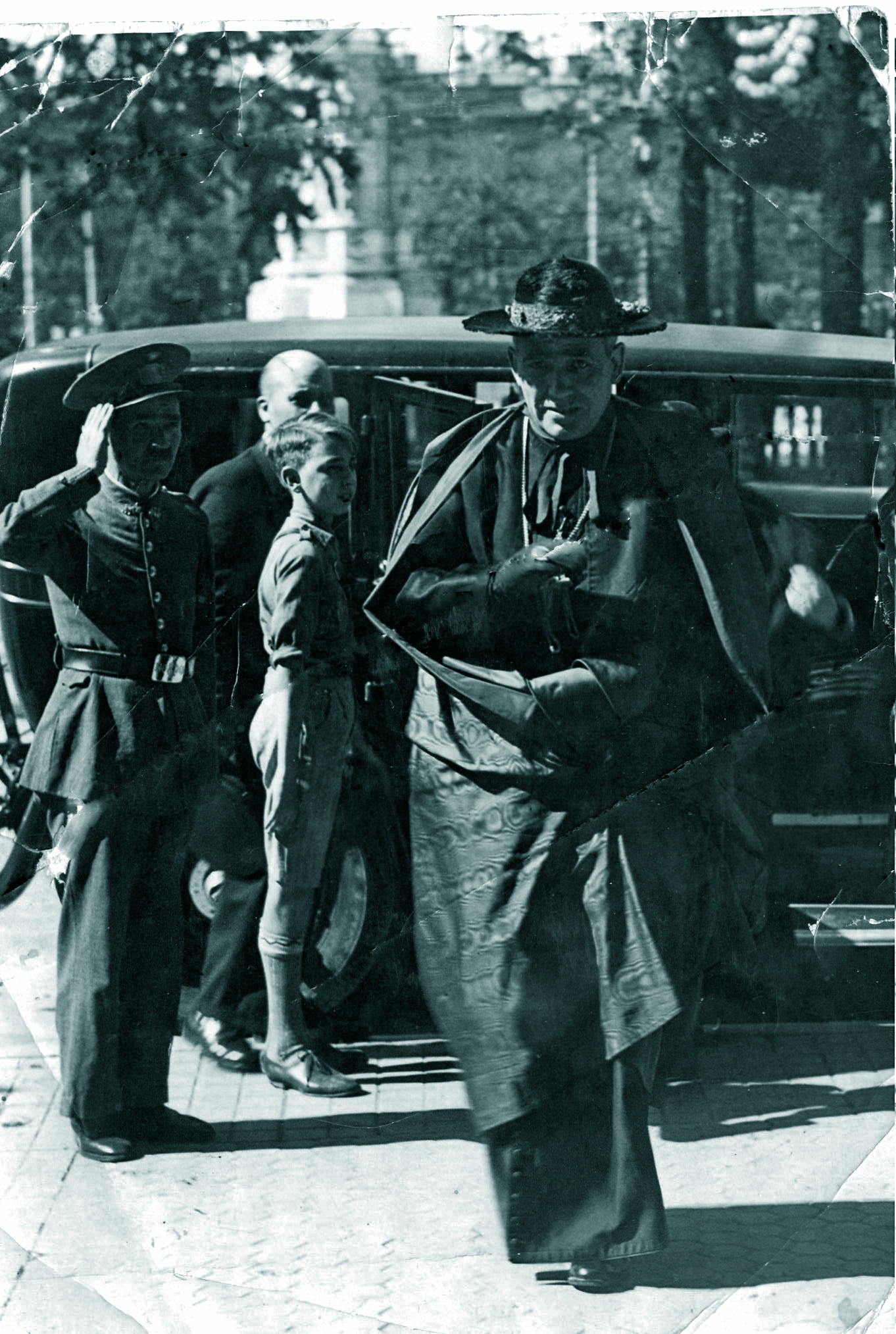
Cardinal Segura - the most integrist of all prelates

The Second Spanish Republic was established on 14 April 1931, after the abdication of King Alfonso XIII. The government, led by President Niceto Alcalá-Zamora, instituted a reformist program, including agrarian reform, right to divorce, vote for women (November 1933), reform of the Army, autonomy for Catalonia and the Basque country (October 1936). The proposed reform was blocked by the right and rejected by the far-left Confederación Nacional del Trabajo. One of the most controversial changes however, was the so-called "separation of the church and state". Article 26 of the 1931 republican constitution, and subsequent legislation, halted state funding for the Catholic Church, banned the Jesuits and other religious institutes, banned clerics from all teaching in schools, appropriated the properties of the Catholic Church and banned processions, statues and other manifestations of Catholicism. These strictures helped to alienate a large mass of the Catholic population. Republicanism represented a confrontation with all that had gone before and could be offensive: " In August 1931 in Málaga, for example, the usual celebrations in honour of Our Lady of Victory under whose patronage the Spanish Crown had driven out the 'Moors' in 1497 were replaced by a beauty pageant to find the city's "Miss Republic". It would have been hard to devise a celebration more calculated to offend Catholics. To convinced Monarchists, the Republic was not merely distasteful, it was an anathema. The Carlist militias, long confined to their Navarrese heartlands, were training in the mountains as early as 1931. " The right's political losses in 1931 left some prepared to give the new regime a chance, "but others, particularly those in the circles around Ángel Herrera Oria and Gil-Robles accepted the rules of the democratic game only as a means to destroy the 1931 Republic." The Republic suffered attacks from the right (the failed coup of Sanjurjo in 1932), and the left (the uprising of Asturias in 1934), also it suffered the impact of the Great Depression.

While the coalition held political power, economic power eluded it. In historian Hugh Thomas's words, 'Like so many others before and since it frightened the middle class without satisfying the workers.' It adopted the measures of separation of church and state, genuine universal suffrage, a cabinet responsible to a single chamber parliament, a secular educational system. The new republican nation was partly to be created through a system of state education, which would be secular, obligatory, free of charge, and available to all. This measure antagonised the Church. Pius XI's 1929 encyclical Divini illius Magistri had said that the Church 'directly and perpetually' possessed 'the whole truth' in the moral sphere. Education was, therefore, 'first and super-eminently' the function of the Church. Primo de Rivera's dictatorship had offered the Church the protection it felt was its due. Now however, the Second Republic excluded the Church from education by prohibiting teaching by religious institutes, even in private schools), confiscated Church property and investments, provided for restrictions and prohibitions on ownership of Church property, and banned the Society of Jesus. (The Catholic revival heralded by the restoration of the monarchy in the person of Isabella's son Alfonso XII of Spain saw the number of religious in the religious congregations soar. Catholic Spain was dominated by the schools, colleges, missions, publications, clinics and hospitals of the religious institutes. The Spanish landed aristocracy and upper middle classes gave buildings and income to the religious congregations to fund schools, hospitals and orphanages - conspicuous examples included Tibidabo hill in Barcelona to Don Bosco, and the Jesuit University in Deusto, from which young men would leave, 'fully armed against all modern errors.' Deemed illiberal they attracted particular attention in the years 1931-33. In the crucial 1933 election no fewer than 20 Deusto men were elected to the republican Cortes for various parties of the Right and Centre. Ángel Herrera Oria director of El Debate, inspirer of the Spanish Confederation of the Autonomous Right was a Deusto man. The most sustained intellectual onslaught against religious was probably that of Miguel de Unamuno and his denunciation of the 'degenerate sons' of Ignatius of Loyola, the Jesuits. He accused their educational endeavours of being corrupted by materialistic and apologetical aims, that they were subservient to an anti-intellectual plutocracy, and that they choked modernity, reform, creativity and even true spirituality with their philistinism and intolerance.)

During the democratic republic of 1931-36 multiple Catholic politicians favoured female suffrage because of its likely benefit to the Right, but simultaneously ridiculed campaigns for women's rights or women in parliament. Women constituted the majority of practising Catholics, but in church always listened to men preach and celebrate the sacraments. Male priests told them to obey their husbands, 'at every turn the message was clear; men were born for authority and social responsibility; women were born for domesticity, motherhood, or sexual renunciation.' Political militancy did not fit easily with these stereotypes, there was no Catholic equivalent of the anarchist Federica Montseny, 'though the Falange's Sección feminina was aggressive in its propagation of an authoritarian, anti-feminist and ever more conservative ideology.' "When some Catholic Basque nationalist women turned their attention in the 1930s to organising meetings and making public speechess, they shocked Catholic contemporaries..after conquering the Basque country during the first year of civil war, soldiers of the Catholic Crusade expressed their loathing for both Basque nationalism and politically active women by subjecting these Emakumes to the humiliation of being dosed with castor oil in public and having their heads shaved."

Since the Republican left considered moderation of the anticlericalist aspects of the constitution as totally unacceptable, the historian Stanley Payne has written that "the Republic as a democratic constitutional regime was doomed from the outset". Commentators have posited that the "hostile" approach to the issues of church and state was a substantial cause of the breakdown of democracy and the onset of civil war. Victor Perez Diaz, in a recent book, characterised the Catholic reaction to the anticlerical offensive as one that mobilized "the mass of peasants and the middle classes and channeling them into professional and political right wing organisations, prepared for by decades of careful organizational work. The extreme right soon took upon itself the task of conspiring to overthrow the regime. The moderate right refused to state its unambiguous loyalty to the new institutions and openly flirted with authoritarianism."

=== Initial reaction of Catholics ===
Despite the anticlerical aspects of the constitution, the Republican coalition's electoral policy stated:

Catholics: the maximum program of the coalition is freedom of religion ... The Republic ... will not persecute any religion.

According to historian Stanley Payne, 'though a deliberate deception,... this propaganda was obviously accepted by many Catholics.' Although at the outset tensions were apparent between the Church hierarchy and the republic, the hierarchy likewise formally accepted the statement, hoping for a continuation of the existing Concordat. Official or organized opposition did not exist at the beginning. The first formal dissent was in May 1931 when the archconservative Cardinal of the Archdiocese of Toledo, Pedro Segura, published a writing in defense of the former king.

=== Burning of the convents ===
Following a monarchist insult on the previous day, when the royal march was played to the crowds on their Sunday paseo in Madrid's Retiro Park, mobs of anarchists and radical socialists sacked the monarchist headquarters in Madrid on May 11, 1931 and then proceeded to set fire or otherwise wreck more than a dozen churches in the capital. Similar acts of arson and vandalism were perpetrated in a score of other cities in southern and eastern Spain. These attacks came to be referred to as the "quema de conventos" (the burning of the convents).

It was alleged that this anticlerical violence was undertaken, for the most part with the acquiescence and in some cases the active assistance of the official Republican authorities. Despite the protests of Miguel Maura - who as minister of the Interior was ultimately responsible for public order - the government refused to intervene and the fever of anticlerical incendiarism spread rapidly around the country – Murcia, Málaga (the most extensive damage occurred in this city), Cádiz, Almería. When criticized by the Catholic Church for not doing more to stop the burning of religious buildings in May 1931 Prime Minister Azaña famously retorted that the burning of "all the convents in Spain was not worth the life of a single Republican".

The burning of the convents set the tone for relations between the Republican left and the Catholic right. The events of 11 May came to be seen as a turning point in the history of the Second Republic. For example, José María Gil-Robles claimed to regard the convent burnings as 'decisive'. He claimed that the fires of 11 May destroyed the precarious coexistence which had been established between Church and State. (Indeed, Gil-Robles persisted in seeing the burnings as the result of planned and co-ordinated action by the republican government. The liberal catholic Ossorio y Gallardo also believed in the likelihood of conspiracy – but as the work of monarchist agents provocateurs.) "From now on", wrote Ossorio", the right was utterly opposed to Maura as if he, a sincere Catholic, had been responsible for burning churches." The political fate of the moderate Catholic Miguel Maura exemplified the predicament of the centre in periods of intense political polarization - though he demonstrated his defence of Church property in May 1931 he was still dubbed by the Catholic right as one who consented 'to Spain being lit by burning churches'.

Gil-Robles was one of the prime beneficiaries of Maura's discomfiture and one of the first to capitalise on it. Following the passage of the 1931 Constitution with its anticlerical clauses Maura (on 14 October 1931) and Alcalá-Zamora resigned – though their resignations did nothing to reconcile them to the agrarian Catholic right. The position of the Catholic republicans was an isolated one.

=== 1931 Constitution ===
In the fall of 1931, a new constitution was passed that prohibited public religious processions and outlawed much of the work of Catholic religious institutes. No fewer than six constitutional articles were used to define the new, subordinate place of the Catholic Church, some modelled on the Portuguese Constitution of 1911. The conservative Catholic Republicans Alcalá-Zamora and Miguel Maura resigned from the government when the controversial articles 26 and 27 of the constitution, which committed the Spanish government to phasing out state funding of clergy stipends, and strictly controlled Church property and prohibited religious institutes from engaging in education were passed. Not only advocates of a confessional state but also certain advocates of church/state separation saw the constitution as hostile; one such advocate of separation, José Ortega y Gasset, stated "the article in which the Constitution legislates the actions of the Church seems highly improper to me." Article 26 - " one of the most divisive articles in the constitution..debarred religious from teaching though not from welfare work. (This attempt to close the religious schools altogether and to keep religious out of the state system was unsuccessful - "the necessary legislation was only completed in June 1933 to take effect for 1 October 1933. The victory of the Right in elections at the end of 1933 immediately rendered it dead.")

In October 1931 José María Gil-Robles the leading spokesman of the parliamentary right declared that the constitution was 'stillborn' - a 'dictatorial Constitution in the name of democracy.' Robles wanted to use mass meetings "to give supporters of the right a sense of their own strength and, ominously, to accustom them 'to fight, when necessary, for the possession of the street.'" Frances Lannon characterizes the constitution as creating a secular democratic system based on equal rights for all, with provision for regional autonomy, but also calls the constitution "divisive" in that the articles on property and religion had a "disregard for civil rights" and ruined the prospect of conservative Catholics Republicans. Likewise, Stanley Payne agrees that the constitution generally accorded a wide range of civil liberties and representation with the notable exception of the rights of Catholics, a circumstance which prevented the formation of an expansive democratic majority.

Frances Lannon, addressing the fears of the Left that Church influence in the schools was a danger to the republic has observed that, "it was demonstrably the case the ideological ambience and spirit of the congregations was anti-socialist, illiberal, and pervaded with the values of the political Right." She gives as one example, "to convey the wider reality", a journal kept by a women's community with a prestigious convent school in Seville. It laments, in April 1931, the departure of the King, its wariness of the Republic antedating any moves against the Church, in November 1933 they go to vote, 'a sacred duty', 'in grave circumstances', the Right's victory greeted as 'better than we could have hoped'. The Asturian rising brings forth the declaration that 'the conduct of the army was magnificent and the rebellion crushed step by step.' In February 1936 there is despair until, 'Relation of the heroic patriotic days of Seville, July 1936', the account of the rising against the Republic is euphoric. In 1937 the convent school hears from Queipo de Llano himself, and there are delirious accounts of military parades and speeches by Quiepo, and Franco in August, until 18 April 1939 official recognition of the school and a letter from Franco's secretary in Burgos thanking the community for its good wishes. "The journal is not exceptional" Lannon concludes, "The politically reactionary sympathies of the teaching religious were formed and sustained by the sociological context and limitations of the schools."

=== Religious communities - education/welfare ===
Disease, poverty, and illiteracy were urgent problems, but in a country with a fiscal system that left most real wealth untaxed, and a large army budget, little public money was directed towards meeting them. Education and welfare needs were met only patchily and religious communities filled the spaces between the patches. Frances Lannon (writing in Privilege, Persecution and Prophecy) observes that even institutions funded by the state or provincial or municipal authorities, were dependent upon religious personnel. The Brothers of St John of God for example specialised in children's hospitals and mental homes. Where welfare was concerned central and local government relied absolutely on the religious congregations to staff as well as supplement their institutions. This was made explicit in the debates on the religious congregations in the constituent Cortes on 8–14 October 1931, and was a major reason then, why the congregations were not entirely disbanded. Yet the religious sometimes found themselves excoriated. Sometimes this was because of the different cultural worlds inhabited on the one hand by religious, almost always from devout and traditional milieux, and on the other by the urban poor. To the former it seemed axiomatic that religious practice should order the daily lives of their various charges, be they children, workmen or reformed prostitutes. There is overwhelming evidence however to show that this typical imposition of religious observance as a condition of eligibility for aid was widely resented. Working class areas of the large cities were notorious for the virtual absence of formal religious practice. Margarita Nelken, in the 1920s, said that the poor residents of the most rundown areas of Madrid had terrible things to say about the charity given by women lay associations and 'not a single word of thanks'. Frances Lannon has further speculated that perhaps the resentment, generated by making charity dependent upon religious tests, and by the sale of goods and services from religious houses, (undercutting those struggling to make a living on the margins of urban society ) goes some way to explain why so many brothers, and even some nuns, whose laudable work might have been expected to save them from popular hatred, were nevertheless massacred in 1936 in the first months of the civil war.

The most bitter controversies about the congregations in the pre-war years, however, had always centred on their schools and colleges to which about half of all male communities and one-third of the female were dedicated.

=== Formation of CEDA ===
The Spanish Confederation of the Autonomous Right (Confederación Española de Derechas Autónomas or CEDA) was founded in February 1933 and was led from its inception by José María Gil-Robles. Despite dismissing the idea of a party as a 'rigid fiction', the CEDA leaders created a stable party organisation which would lead the Spanish right into the age of mass politics. The campaign against the constitution began in CEDA's Castilian heartlands.

=== Dilectissima Nobis ===
On 3 June 1933, in the encyclical Dilectissima Nobis (On Oppression Of The Church Of Spain), Pope Pius XI condemned the Spanish Government's deprivation of the civil liberties on which the Republic was supposedly based, noting in particular the expropriation of Church property and schools and the persecution of religious communities and orders. He demanded restitution of the expropriated properties which were now, by law, property of the Spanish State, to which the Church had to pay rent and taxes in order to continue using these properties. "Thus the Catholic Church is compelled to pay taxes on what was violently taken from her" Religious vestments, liturgical instruments, statues, pictures, vases, gems and similar objects necessary for worship were expropriated as well. The encyclical urged Catholics in Spain to fight with all legal means against these injustices and to not allow any truce with Spanish republicans, blaming them to be essentially Anti-Catholics and impossible to co-operate with their illegit institutions.

5. Certainly to no other causes than to this discipline and subjection inspired by Catholic teachings and spirit have we the right to attribute the possibility of maintaining some peace and public tranquillity while the turbulence of parties and the passions of revolutionaries worked to propel the nation toward the abyss of anarchy. It has therefore caused Us great amazement and profound anguish to learn that some, as if it were to justify the iniquitous proceedings against the Church, publicly alleged a necessity of defending the new Republic. From the foregoing, it appears so evident that the alleged motive was nonexistent, that we can only conclude the struggle against the Church in Spain is not so much due to a misunderstanding of the Catholic Faith and its beneficial institutions, as of a hatred against the Lord and His Christ nourished by groups subversive to any religious and social order, as alas we have seen in Mexico and Russia.

— Dilectissima Nobis

=== 1933 election ===
The announcement of a general election in November 1933 brought about an unprecedented mobilization of the Spanish right. El Debate instructed its readers to make the coming elections into an "obsession", the " sublime culmination of citizenly duties," so that victory in the polls would bring an end to the nightmare of the republican bienio rojo. Great emphasis was placed on the techniques of electoral propaganda. Gil-Robles visited Nazi Germany to study modern methods, including the Nuremberg Rally. A national electoral committee was established, comprising CEDA, Alfonsist, Traditionalist, and Agrarian representatives - but excluding Miguel Maura's Conservative Republicans. The CEDA swamped entire localities with electoral publicity. The party produced ten million leaflets, together with some two hundred thousand coloured posters and hundreds of cars were used to distribute this material through the provinces. In all of the major cities propaganda films were shown around the streets on screens mounted on large lorries.

The need for unity was the constant theme of the campaign fought by the CEDA and the election was presented as a confrontation of ideas, not of personalities. The electors' choice was simple: they voted for redemption or revolution and they voted for Christianity or Communism. The fortunes of Republican Spain, according to one of its posters had been decided by 'immorality and anarchy'. Catholics who continued to proclaim their republicanism were moved into the revolutionary camp and multiple speeches argued that the Catholic republican option had become totally illegitimate. 'A good Catholic may not vote for the Conservative Republican party' declared a Gaceta Regional editorial and the impression was given that Conservative Republicans, far from being Catholics, were in fact anti-religious.

In this all-round attack on the political centre, the mobilization of women also became a major electoral tactic of the Catholic right. The Asociación Femenina de Educación had been formed in October 1931. As the 1933 general election approached women were warned that unless they voted correctly communism would come " which will tear your children from your arms, your parish church will be destroyed, the husband you love will flee from your side authorized by the divorce law, anarchy will come to the countryside, hunger and misery to your home." AFEC orators and organisers urged women to vote 'For God and for Spain!' Mirroring the female qualities emphasized by AFEC the CEDA's self-styled sección de defensa brought young male activists to the fore. This new CEDA squad was very much in evidence on election day itself, when its members patrolled the streets and polling stations in the provincial capital, supposedly to prevent the left from tampering with the ballot boxes.

=== Lerroux government ===
In the 1933 elections, the CEDA won a plurality of seats; however, these were not enough to form a majority. Despite the CEDA's plurality of seats, President Niceto Alcalá-Zamora declined to invite its leader, José Maria Gil-Robles, to form a government, and instead assigned the task to Alejandro Lerroux of the Radical Republican Party. CEDA supported the Lerroux government and subsequently received three ministerial positions. Hostility between the left and the right increased after the 1933 formation of the Government. Spain experienced general strikes and street conflicts. Notable among the strikes was the miners' revolt in northern Spain and riots in Madrid. Nearly all rebellions were crushed by the Government and political arrests followed.

As the political situation deteriorated leftist radicals became more aggressive, and conservatives turned to paramilitary and vigilante actions. According to official sources, 330 people were assassinated and 1,511 were wounded in political violence; records show 213 failed assassination attempts, 113 general strikes, and the destruction (typically by arson) of 160 religious buildings.

The Lerroux government suspended a number of the initiatives of the previous Manuel Azaña government, provoking an armed miners' rebellion in Asturias on October 6, and an autonomist rebellion in Catalonia. Both rebellions were suppressed (Asturias rebellion by young General Francisco Franco and colonial troops), being followed by mass political arrests and trials.

=== Anti-leftist rhetoric ===
The Asturias revolt was another defeat for the European left - in Germany Hitler had destroyed organized labour, liquidating Europe's strongest communist party, in Austria, the Catholic corporatist Dolfuss, admired by the CEDA, had used paramilitary forces to crush Viennese Marxists of all varieties. To the right Asturias was proof of the revolutionary left's plans for Spain. The rebels had murdered thirty-four priests and seminarians - the most clerical blood spilt in Spain in over a hundred years.

In Catholic Salamanca, for example, the sons and daughters of the Church were exhorted to mark the victory in Asturias by prayer and penance and make reparation to the majestic and victorious figure of Christ the King. "The figure of Christ clothed in majesty was also used by the Catholic right as a symbol of the triumph of their cause. In Spain, as in Belgium or Mexico, Christ the King had become the symbol of militant Catholicism." For example, the Catholic Gaceta Nacional celebrated the suppression of the rebellions and its editor said that the uprisings had been followed not by repression but by justice. The CEDA paper, El Debate spoke of 'the passions of the beast'. "Against the dehumanized forces of the international revolution - believed to be manipulated by the shadowy figures of Soviet Communists, Freemasons and Jews - the army had stood firm."

As a prelude to the CEDA's 1933 election campaign, Gil Robles had announced the need to purge the fatherland of 'Judaizing Freemasons' and the stock figures of the grasping Jew and Machiavellian Mason occurred again and again in the party's electoral propaganda. The Dominican journal La Ciencia Tomista issued from San Esteban in Salamanca proclaimed the continuing relevance of The Protocols of the Elders of Zion. Jewish Marxists, expelled from ghettos across the world, took refuge in Spain where "they settle down and sprawl about, as in conquered territories".

"This conspiratorial rhetoric came to the fore during the election campaigns of November 1933 and February 1936, in both cases allowing the Catholic right to present the fight at the ballot box as an apocalyptic battle between good and evil. Extremist rhetoric and anti-semitic theory - prevalent among both supporters and orators of the CEDA - provided immediate common ground between Catholic parliamentarians and the extreme right."

In 1934, a Spanish cleric named Aniceto de Castro Albarrán wrote El derecho a la rebeldia, a theological defence of armed rebellion that was serialised in the Carlist press, published under the usual ecclesiastical licences.

=== Juventudes de Acción Popular ===
The Juventudes de Acción Popular, the youth wing within the CEDA, soon developed its own identity differentiating itself from the main body of the CEDA. The JAP emphasized sporting and political activity. It had its own fortnightly paper, the first issue of which proclaimed: 'We want a new state.' The JAP's distaste for the principles of universal suffrage was such that internal decisions were never voted upon. As the thirteenth point of the JAP put it: 'Anti-parliamentarianism. Anti-dictatorship. The people participating in Government in an organic manner, not by degenerate democracy.' The line between Christian corporatism and fascist statism became thin indeed. The fascist tendencies of the JAP were vividly demonstrated in the series of rallies held by the CEDA youth movement during the course of 1934. Using the title jefe, the JAP cultivated an intense allegiance to Gil-Robles. Gil-Robles himself had returned from the 1933 Nuremberg Rally and praised its " youthful enthusiasm, steeped in optimism, so different from the desolate and enervating scepticism of our defeatists and 'intellectuals'."

=== Shift of the CEDA to the right ===
Between November 1934 and March 1935, the CEDA minister for agriculture, Manuel Giménez Fernández, introduced into parliament a series of agrarian reform measures designed to better conditions in the Spanish countryside. These moderate proposals met with a hostile response from reactionary elements within the Cortes, including the conservative wing of the CEDA and the proposed reform was defeated. A change of personnel in the ministry also followed. The agrarian reform bill proved to be a catalyst for a series of increasingly bitter divisions within the Catholic right, rifts that indicated that the broad based CEDA alliance was disintegrating. Partly as a result of the impetus of the JAP, the Catholic party had been moving further to the right, forcing the resignation of moderate government figures, including Filiberto Villalobos. Gil Robles was not prepared to return the agriculture portfolio to Gimenez Fernandez. Mary Vincent writes that, despite the CEDA's rhetoric supporting Catholic social teaching, the extreme right ultimately prevailed.

=== Failure of parliamentary Catholicism ===
In the 1936 Elections a new coalition of Socialists (Spanish Socialist Workers' Party, PSOE), liberals (Republican Left and the Republican Union Party), Communists, and various regional nationalist groups won the extremely tight election. The results gave 34 percent of the popular vote to the Popular Front and 33 percent to the incumbent government of the CEDA. This result, when coupled with the Socialists' refusal to participate in the new government, led to a general fear of revolution.

In elections on February 16, 1936, CEDA lost power to the left-wing Popular Front. Support for Gil-Robles and his party evaporated almost overnight as the CEDA haemorrhaged members to the Falange. Mary Vincent writes that, "(the) rapid radicalization of the CEDA youth movement effectively meant that all attempts to save parliamentary Catholicism were doomed to failure.

=== Catholic support for the rebellion ===
Many CEDA supporters welcomed the military rebellion in the summer of 1936 which led to the Spanish Civil War, and a number of them joined Franco's National Movement. However, General Franco was determined not to have competing right-wing parties in Spain and, in April 1937, CEDA was dissolved.

According to Mary Vincent, "The tragedy of the Second Spanish Republic was that it abetted its own destruction; the tragedy of the Church was that it became so closely allied with its self-styled defenders that its own sphere of action was severely compromised. The Church, grateful for the championship offered first by José María Gil-Robles y Quiñones and then by Franco, entered into a political alliance which would prevent it carrying out the pastoral task it had itself identified."

According to Mary Vincent, "The Church was to become the most important source of legitimation for the rebellious generals, justifying the rising as a crusade against godlessness, anarchy and communism. Although such a close identification with the Nationalist cause was not to be fully elaborated until the Spanish hierarchy's joint pastoral letter of July 1937, there was no doubt that the Church would line up with the rebels against the Republic. Nor, at local level, was there any hesitancy. The only sizeable group of Catholics to remain loyal to the republic were the Basques. " Similarly, Victor M Perez-Diaz wrote, "The church reacted to all this by mobilizing the mass of peasants and the middle classes and channeling them into professional and political right wing organisations prepared for by decades of careful organisation. The extreme right took upon itself the task of conspiring to overthrow the regime. The moderate right refused to state its unambiguous loyalty to the new institutions and openly flirted with authoritarianism."

Frances Lannon has propounded a view which suggests the existence of an 'exiguous Catholic minority which saw in the Church's crusade against the Republic not a defensive holy war that began in 1936 and deserved their support, but a long series of class commitments on political and socio-economic policies which themselves powerfully helped to create the ruthless and desperate anti-clericalism unleashed by the war. "Republican Catholics like José Manuel Gallegos Rocafull, Ángel Ossorio y Gallardo, and José Bergamín, all wrote scathing criticisms of the Church's role in covering with a religious cloak the political, military and class aims of the anti-Republicans. The ex-Jesuit Joan Vilar i Costa refuted the 1937 collective pastoral letter, the Catalan democratic Catholic politician Manuel Carrasco Formiguera was executed on Franco's orders in April 1938 because he also failed to agree with official Catholic views. These men emphasised that the Church's anti-Republican alignment did not originate in, although it was certainly strengthened by the massacres of priests, monks and Catholic faithful by groups of Republicans, and Lannon concludes: "The crusade had been waged for a long time by the Church for its own institutional interests, for survival. The cost of its survival was the destruction of the Republic."

== The White Terror and Red Terror ==
The Spanish episcopate overwhelmingly endorsed Franco's Spain. One notable exception was Mugica, the Bishop of Vitoria, who wrote : "According to the Spanish episcopate, justice is well administered in Franco's Spain, and this is simply not true. I possess long lists of fervent Christians and exemplary priests who have been murdered with impunity and without trial or any legal formality. " There were incidents in which Nationalists murdered Catholic clerics. In one particular incident, following the capture of Bilbao, hundreds of people, including 16 priests who had served as chaplains for the Republican forces, were taken to the countryside or to graveyards to be murdered. In Navarra the clergy, who had a tradition of being ready to take up arms, "the religious-patriotic zeal of some of the priests was extraordinary." One priest, who was hearing the confession of a socialist prisoner about to die, restrained him as he sought to escape as an aeroplane passed over, telling him he could not allow him to leave before he had given him absolution, so that the prisoner died shortly afterwards. In Nationalist areas, parish priests could decide matters of life and death where it could be fatal to be known as someone who had voted for the Left or had simply not attended Mass. Marcelino Olaechea, the Bishop of Pamplona observed the situation; "In every village and town, I see rising up a gigantic mountain of heroism and a fathomless soul full of pain and apprehension. Let me speak of the fears. Souls who, trembling with fear, come flocking to the Church wanting baptism and marriage, confession and Holy Communion. They come sincerely, but they didn't come before. The links of the chains that held them as prisoners have been broken and they run to the warmth and comfort of the faith but they bring fear with them as well, piercing the soul like a dagger. "

In the Republican zone Roman Catholic clergy and faithful were attacked and murdered in reaction to news of the military revolt. Roman Catholic churches, convents, monasteries, seminaries and cemeteries were sacked, burned and desecrated. 13 bishops were killed from the dioceses of Sigüenza, Lleida, Cuenca, Barbastro Segorbe, Jaén, Ciudad Real, Almería, Guadix, Barcelona, Teruel and the auxiliary of Tarragona. Aware of the dangers, they all decided to remain in their cities. I cannot go, only here is my responsibility, whatever may happen, said the Bishop of Cuenca In addition 4,172 diocesan priests, 2,364 monks and friars, among them 259 Clarentians, 226 Franciscans, 204 Piarists, 176 Brothers of Mary, 165 Christian Brothers, 155 Augustinians, 132 Dominicans, and 114 Jesuits were killed. In some dioceses, a number of secular priests were killed:

- In Barbastro 123 of 140 priests were killed. about 88 percent of the secular clergy were murdered, 66 percent
- In Lleida, 270 of 410 priests were killed. about 62 percent
- In Tortosa, 44 percent of the secular priests were killed.
- In Toledo 286 of 600 priests were killed.
- In the dioceses of Málaga, Menorca and Segorbe, about half of the priests were killed"
- In Madrid 4,000 priests were murdered.

One source records that 283 nuns were killed, some of whom were badly tortured. Catholic faithful were forced to swallow rosary beads, thrown down mine shafts and priests were forced to dig their own graves before being buried alive. The Catholic Church has canonized several martyrs of the Spanish Civil War and beatified hundreds more.

== Foreign involvement ==
The Catholic Church portrayed the war in Spain as a holy one against "godless communists" and called for Catholics in other countries to support the Nationalists against the Republicans. Approximately 183,000 foreign troops fought for Franco's Nationalists. Not all of them were volunteers and not all who volunteered did so for religious reasons. Hitler sent the Condor Legion - 15,000 German pilots, gunners and tank crews. Mussolini sent 80,000 Italian troops, a move which improved his popularity with Italian Catholics. Portugal's Salazar sent 20,000 troops. Approximately 3000 volunteers from around the world joined the Nationalists from countries such as the United Kingdom, Australia, France, Ireland, Poland, Argentina, Belgium and Norway.

== Legacy ==
Within Spain, the Civil War still raises high emotions.

=== Beatifications ===
Pope John Paul II beatified a total of about 500 martyrs in the years 1987, 1989, 1990, 1992, 1993, 1995, 1997 and March 11, 2001. Some 233 executed clergy were beatified by Pope John Paul II on 11 March 2001. Regarding the selection of Candidates, Archbishop Edward Novack from theCongregation of Saints explained in an interview with L'Osservatore Romano : "Ideologies such as Nazism or Communism serve as a context of martyrdom, but in the foreground the person stands out with his conduct, and, case by case, it is important that the people among whom the person lived should affirm and recognize his fame as a martyr and then pray to him, obtaining graces. It is not so much ideologies that concern us, as the sense of faith of the People of God, who judge the person's behaviour

Benedict XVI beatified 498 more Spanish martyrs in October 2007, in what has become the largest beatification ceremony in the history of the Catholic Church. In a speech to 30,000 pilgrims in St Peter's Square, Pope Benedict XVI paid tribute to the martyrs of the Civil War and put them on the path to sainthood. “Their forgiveness towards their persecutors should enable us to work towards reconciliation and peaceful coexistence,” he said. The Pope's mass beatification of clergy allied with Franco's side during the Civil War caused outrage on the Left in Spain. Some have criticized the beatifications as dishonoring non-clergy who were also killed in the war, and as being an attempt to draw attention away from the church's support of Franco (some quarters of the Church called the Nationalist cause a "crusade"). Critics have pointed out that only priests aligned with Franco's troops were honoured. In this group of people, the Vatican has not included all Spanish martyrs, nor any of the 16 priests who were executed by the nationalist side in the first years of the war. This decision has caused numerous criticisms from surviving family members and several political organisations in Spain. “Priests killed in Catalonia or the Basque Country loyal to the republic are not being beatified,” Alejandro Quiroga, Professor of Spanish History at the University of Newcastle, characterized the beatifications as “...a very selective, political reading of the whole thing.”

The act of beatification has also coincided in time with the debate on the Law of Historical Memory (about the treatment of the victims of the war and its aftermath) promoted by the Spanish Government.

Responding to the criticism, the Vatican has described the October 2007 beatifications as relating to personal virtues and holiness, not ideology. They are not about "resentment but ... reconciliation". The Vatican said it was not taking sides, but merely wished to honour those who had died for their religious beliefs.The Spanish government has supported the beatifications, sending Foreign Minister Miguel Ángel Moratinos to attend the ceremony.

The October 2007 beatifications have brought the number of martyred persons beatified by the Church to 977, eleven of whom have already been canonized as Saints. Because of the extent of the persecution, many more cases could be proposed; as many as 10,000 according to Catholic Church sources. The process for beatification has already been initiated for about 2,000 people.

=== Lack of apology ===
For the most part, the Catholic Church has always highlighted its role as a victim in the 1936–39 war. The most famous happening of the joint assembly of bishops and priests in September 1971 however, saw the passage by a majority, but not the requisite two-thirds majority for formal acceptance, of the statement that; "We humbly recognise and ask pardon that we did not know how, when it was necessary, to be true ministers of reconciliation in the midst of our people torn by a fratricidal war." In November 2007, Bishop Ricardo Blázquez, head of Spain's Episcopal Conference, said that the Church must also seek forgiveness for “concrete acts” during the strife-torn period. “On multiple occasions we have reasons to thank God for what was done and for the people who acted, [but] probably in other moments. . . we should ask for forgiveness and change direction,”

In 2009 the bishops of Guipuzcoa, Alava and Vizcaya issued a public apology for the "unjustified silence of our official Church media" regarding indiscriminate killings and executions of the Francoist regime. However, despite repeated papal visits to Spain in recent years so far no apology from the Vatican has been forthcoming. Vatican authorities are evading the question of the historical complicity with a dictatorship that came to power after a bloody Civil War, supported by Nazi Germany and Fascist Italy, as well as with the atrocities of the White Terror phase. While the Vatican has recently beatified religious victims of the Red Terror, it has denied beatification to the multiple Spanish republican religious victims of the White Terror. Thus, by still taking sides, it has not initiated so far a process of reconciliation in Spain.

== See also ==
- Collective Letter of the Spanish Bishops, 1937
- Spanish Civil War
- Red Terror (Spain)
- White Terror (Spain)
