= Gallego (surname) =

Gallego is a Spanish surname. It is a regional name denoting someone from Galicia. Notable people with the surname include:

- Alain Bernat Gallego (born 1971), Andorran politician
- Américo Gallego, Argentine footballer
- Antonio Gallego, Spanish musicologist
- Blas Gallego (born 1941), Spanish artist
- Fernando Gallego (c. 1440–1507), Spanish painter
- Gerald and Charlene Gallego, American married couple who committed serial murders from 1978 to 1980
- Gina Gallego (born 1955), American actor
- José Antonio Gallego (1942–2026), Spanish politician
- José Gallego (footballer born 1923), Spanish footballer
- José Gallego (footballer born 1959), Spanish footballer
- Joseph Shalom Gallego (d. 1624), poet and cantor
- Kate Gallego (born 1981), American politician
- Luis Miguel Gallego (born 1970), Mexican singer
- Mike Gallego (born 1960), American baseball player and coach
- Miryam Gallego (born 1976), Spanish actress
- Pete Gallego, American politician
- Ricardo Gallego, Spanish footballer
- Ruben Gallego (born 1979), American politician
- Rubén Gallego (born 1968), Russian writer
- Soledad Gallego-Díaz (born 1950/1951), Spanish journalist

== See also ==
- Gallego (disambiguation)
- Gallegos, surname
- Gallegos (disambiguation)
- Galicia (Spain), place of origin for Gallego, Gallegos and los Gallegos names for "those from Galicia"
