= Choirboy =

Boy member of a choir

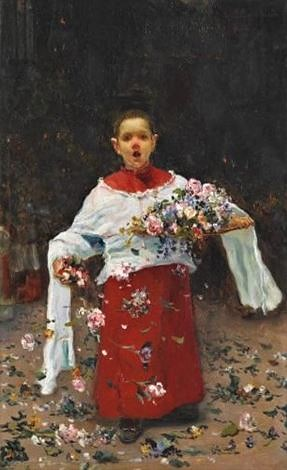
José Gallegos y Arnosa, El monaguillo (The Chorister)

A choirboy is a boy or young male who sings in a choir, typically with a treble voice, particularly in a church or cathedral setting.

As a derisive slang term, it refers to a do-gooder or someone who is morally upright, in the same sense that "Boy Scout" (also derisively) refers to someone who is considered honorable.

== History ==
The use of choirboys in Christian liturgical music can be traced back to pre-Christian times. Saint Paul's dictum that "women should be silent in churches" (mulieres in ecclesiis taceant) resonated with this largely patriarchal tradition; the development of vocal polyphony from the Middle Ages through the Renaissance and Baroque thus took place largely, though not exclusively, in the context of the all-male choir, in which all voice parts were sung by men and boys.

The first known usage in print of the term "choirboy" (rather than the earlier "singing boy") was by the Victorian novelist William Makepeace Thackeray (1811–1863) in Chapter Vii of his story The Ravenswing, published in Fraser's Magazine for Town and Country (London, Sept. 1843, XXVIII/165, p. 321): "He had been a choir-boy at Windsor".

In more recent years as girls have begun joining formerly all-male choirs, the gender-neutral term chorister is more often being used instead. (Until the late 20th century chorister was sometimes applied to adult choral singers too, but is now limited to children.)

== Becoming a chorister ==
Boys are generally eligible to join a choir at the age of seven. Voice trials are part of the selection process for larger choirs and tend to measure the quality of voice and pitch recognition rather than singing experience. Boys that are accepted into a choir begin as probationers.

Extensive musical training is provided, in particular for cathedral choristers. A number of famous composers and musicians began their careers as choristers. In 1740, Joseph Haydn was sent at the age of eight to Vienna to become a choirboy at Saint Stephen's Cathedral. Franz Schubert was accepted into the choir of the Imperial Court Chapel in 1808 when he was 11. Dudley Moore became a choirboy at six.

A small bursary is paid to the boys each term, and opportunities arise for other bonuses during the year.

== Choristers of the Year ==
The Royal School of Church Music (RSCM) organized the first UK competition for Choirboy of the Year in 1975. It was sponsored by Rediffusion and received more than 2,500 entries. The final, which took place in St George's, Hanover Square, London, was won by Matthew Billsborough. He sang the St. Matthew Passion by Bach. The last RSCM national competition was held in 1992, and was won by Gavin Moralee (now known as Gavin Cranmer-Moralee). He sang The Monk and his Cat by Samuel Barber and How Beautiful are the feet from Handel's Messiah.

The competition was open only to boy choristers up until 1986 when the BBC first organized an additional separate competition for girl choristers through the age of 16. The two competitions ran side-by-side for three years before the RSCM competition began including girls in its own competitions, naming both a choirboy and choirgirl of the year. From 1989 to 1992, both the BBC and RSCM named a different girl as Choirgirl of the Year.

The winner of 1995 BBC Choirgirl of the year was Tabitha Watling. In it, she was also competing against Katherine Jenkins.

In 1998, BBC Radio 2 began hosting a combined boys and girls competition, without any other simultaneous competitions. James Fox, from St. Mary's Warwick, was named Choirboy of the Year and Eloise Irving, from West Sussex, was named Choirgirl of the Year. The format has remained the same through the most recent competition.

Thomas Jesty was BBC Young Chorister of the Year 2004. Both he and Harry Sever (the 2003 winner) had solos on the December 2004 album "Hear My Prayer". They also took part in the United Kingdom's biggest fundraising concert in aid of the victims of the 2004 Boxing Day tsunami.

The 2005 winners of the competition were Laura Wright (15) from Suffolk and Sam Adams-Nye from Bristol.

The 2007 winners of the BBC Radio 2 Young Chorister of the Year competition were twelve-year-old Joel Whitewood of Canterbury Cathedral and 15-year-old Charlotte Louise McKechnie of Giffnock South Church in Scotland. The finals were held at St Paul's Cathedral in London and hosted by Aled Jones.

The 2008 winners of the BBC Radio 2 Young Chorister of the Year competition were twelve-year-old Harry Bradford of the Chapel Royal, St. James's Palace, London and 14-year-old Alice Halstead of St. Alphege's Church, Solihull. The finals were held at St Paul's Cathedral in London and hosted by Charles Hazlewood.

In 2011 Richard Decker of the Queen's Chapel of the Savoy and St Olave's Grammar School was awarded chorister of the year. The 2012 winners of the BBC Radio 2 Young Chorister of the Year competition were thirteen-year-old Isaac Waddington of the Choir of Chichester Cathedral, West Sussex and 15-year-old Louisa Stirland. The finals were held at St Martin in the Fields and hosted by Aled Jones.

== See also ==
- Boy soprano
- Boys' choir
- Choir stalls
- Royal School of Church Music
- The Choirboys, British boyband
