= Island of San Simón =

Island belonging to the San Simón archipelago, Spain

Coordinates: 42°18′27″N 8°37′43″W

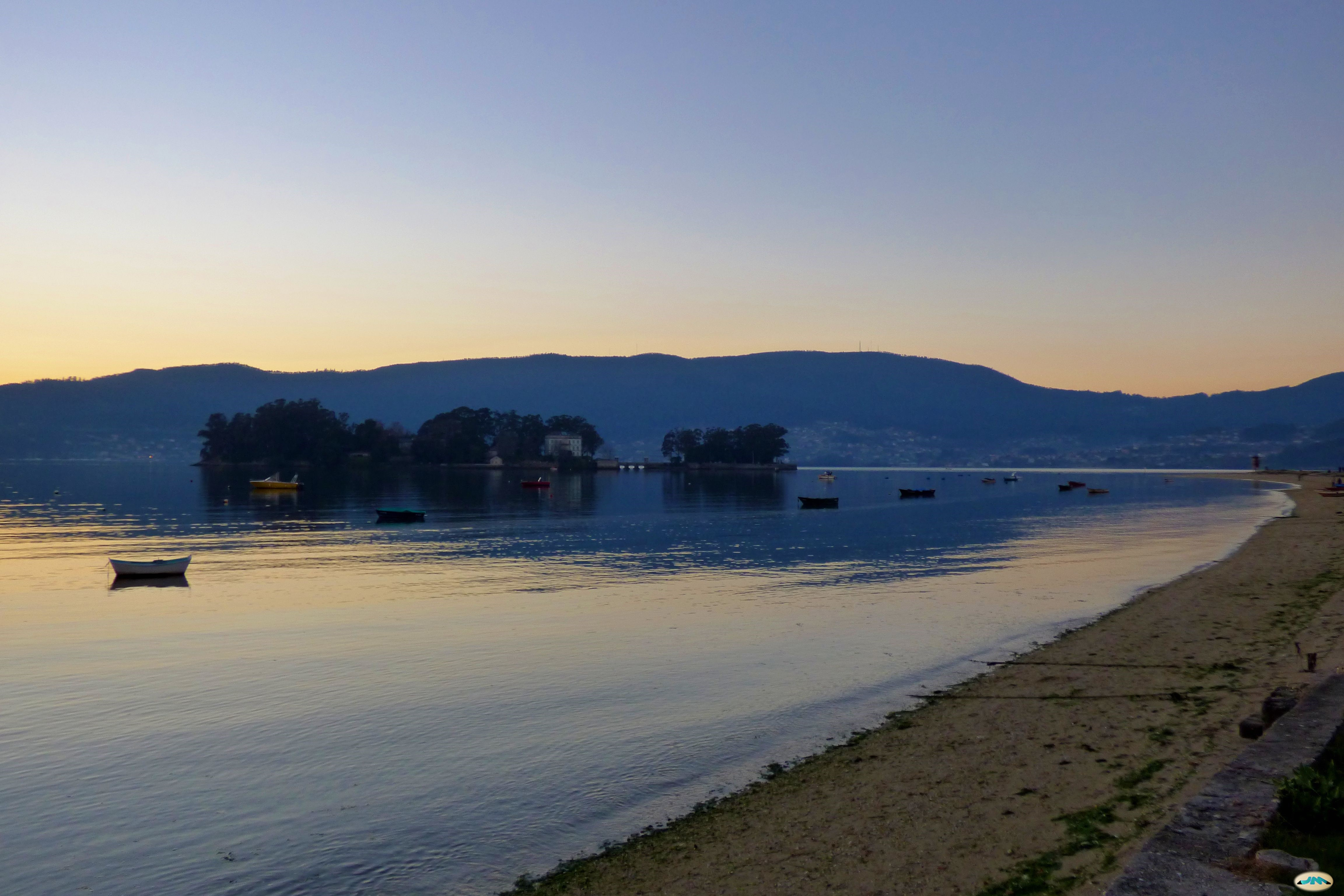
Islas de San Simón y San Antón

The Island of San Simón, which alongside San Antón and other islets, is part of the San Simón archipelago in the Vigo estuary, Spain. The islands are one of five parts of the parish of Cesantes in the municipality of Redondela. As of 2021, San Simón is uninhabited.

The island presides over the inlet of San Simón at the inner end of the Vigo estuary, which drains the municipalities of Redondela, Soutomaior and Vilaboa. It is linked to the San Antón by a bridge. The two islands are 250 metres (820 ft) wide and 84 metres (276 ft) long. Nearby are two other small islets, San Bartolomé and San Norberto. Throughout its history, the island was used as a monastery, a lazaretto, a prison and an orphanage. The two islands as a whole have been listed as a Bien de Interés Cultural with the category of Historic Site since 29 July 1999.

== History ==
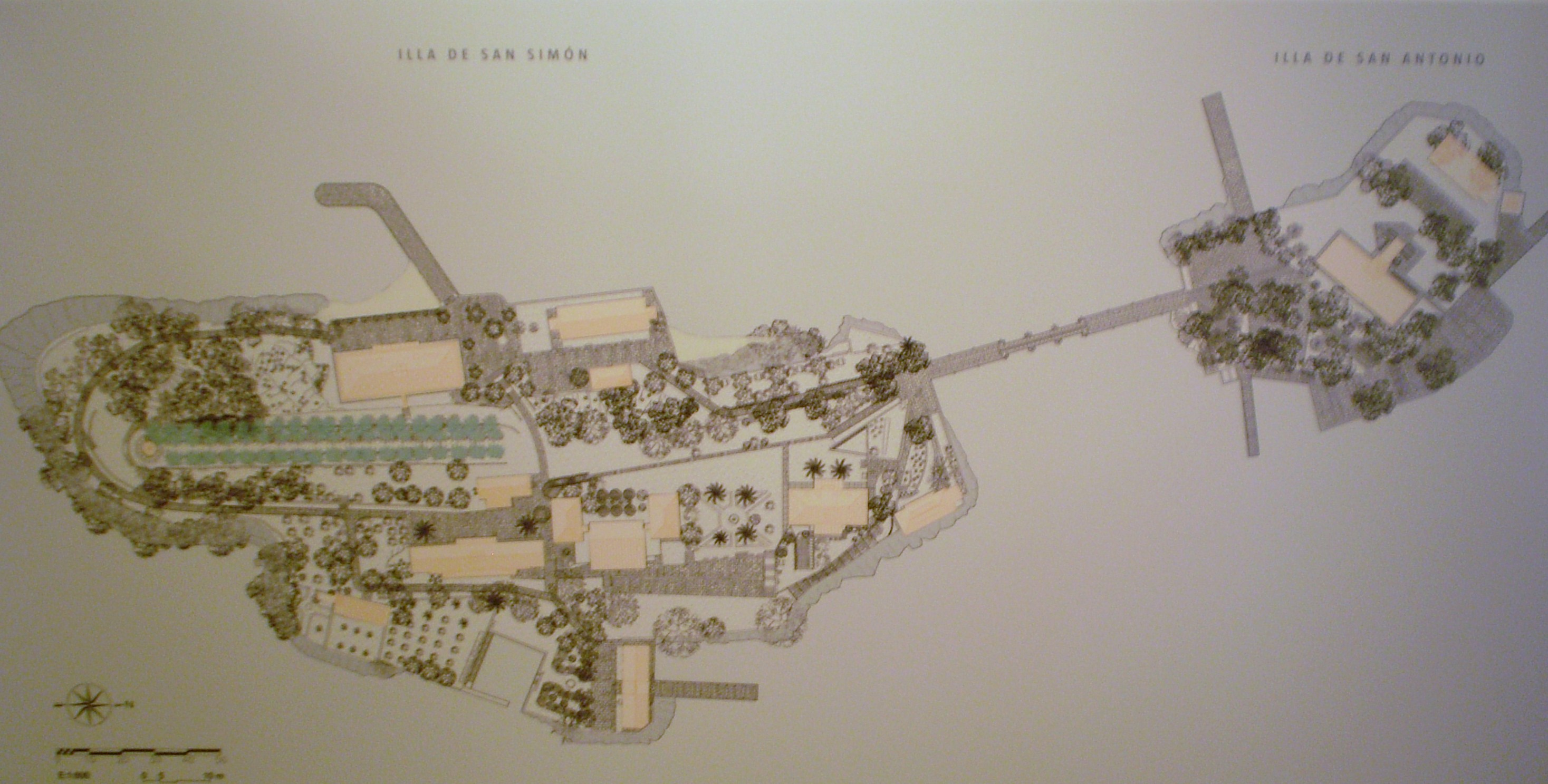
Map of San Simón Archipelago

=== Middle Ages ===
The Island of San Simón was an ancient monastic centre the poet Mendinho sang about in the Middle Ages; this song is the author's only known writing. In his honor a bust was made on the island, as well as Johan de Cangas and Martín Codax.

Sediam'eu na ermida de San Simón
e cercaronm'as ondas, que grandes son,
eu atendend'o meu amigo,
eu atendendo'o meu amigo...

Between the 12th and 13th centuries, the island was inhabited by the Knights Templar and later by the Franciscans, the Paschaline order of Saint Simon. But in 1370 this religious order was excommunicated and forced to abandon the island. After being abandoned for almost a century, the diocese of Tuy, which until then had political control of the island, ceded it to Isabella the Catholic, in an act of kindness and gratitude for her loyalty.

After remaining abandoned for almost a century, the diocese of Tui, which until then had political control of the island, ceded it to Elizabeth the Catholic in an act of kindness and gratitude for her fidelity. In his honor, a bust was made on the island, as well as those of Johan de Cangas and Martín Codax. In 1589, it was successfully attacked by English privateers under Francis Drake.

=== Eighteenth century until the Spanish Civil War ===
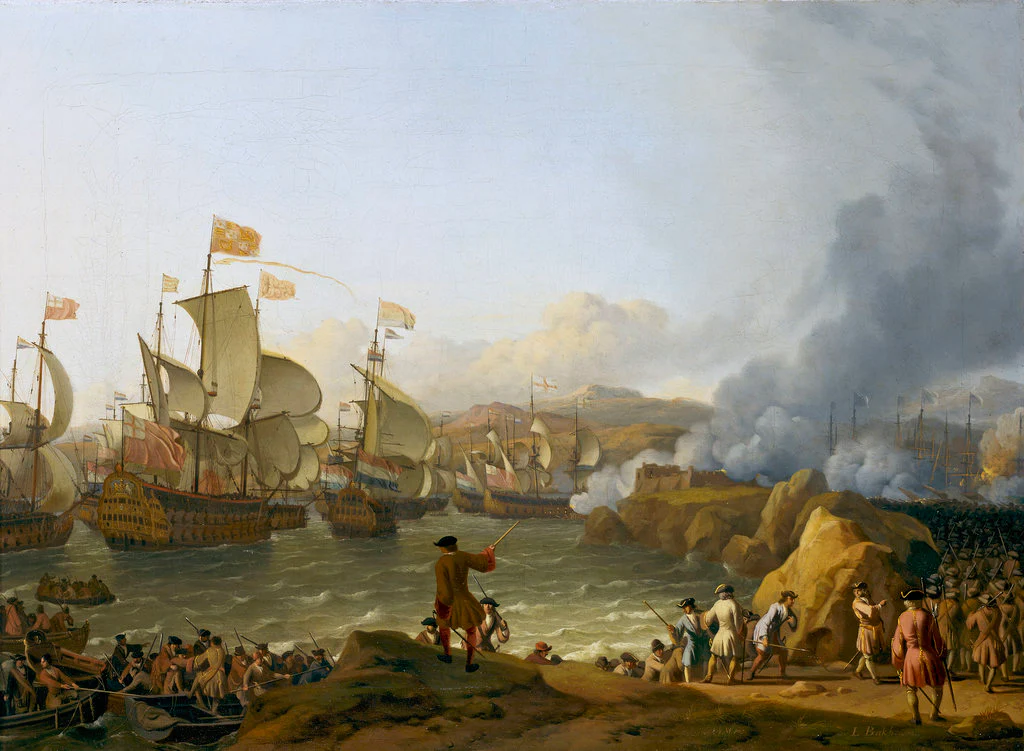
The Battle of Vigo Bay, 12 October 1702

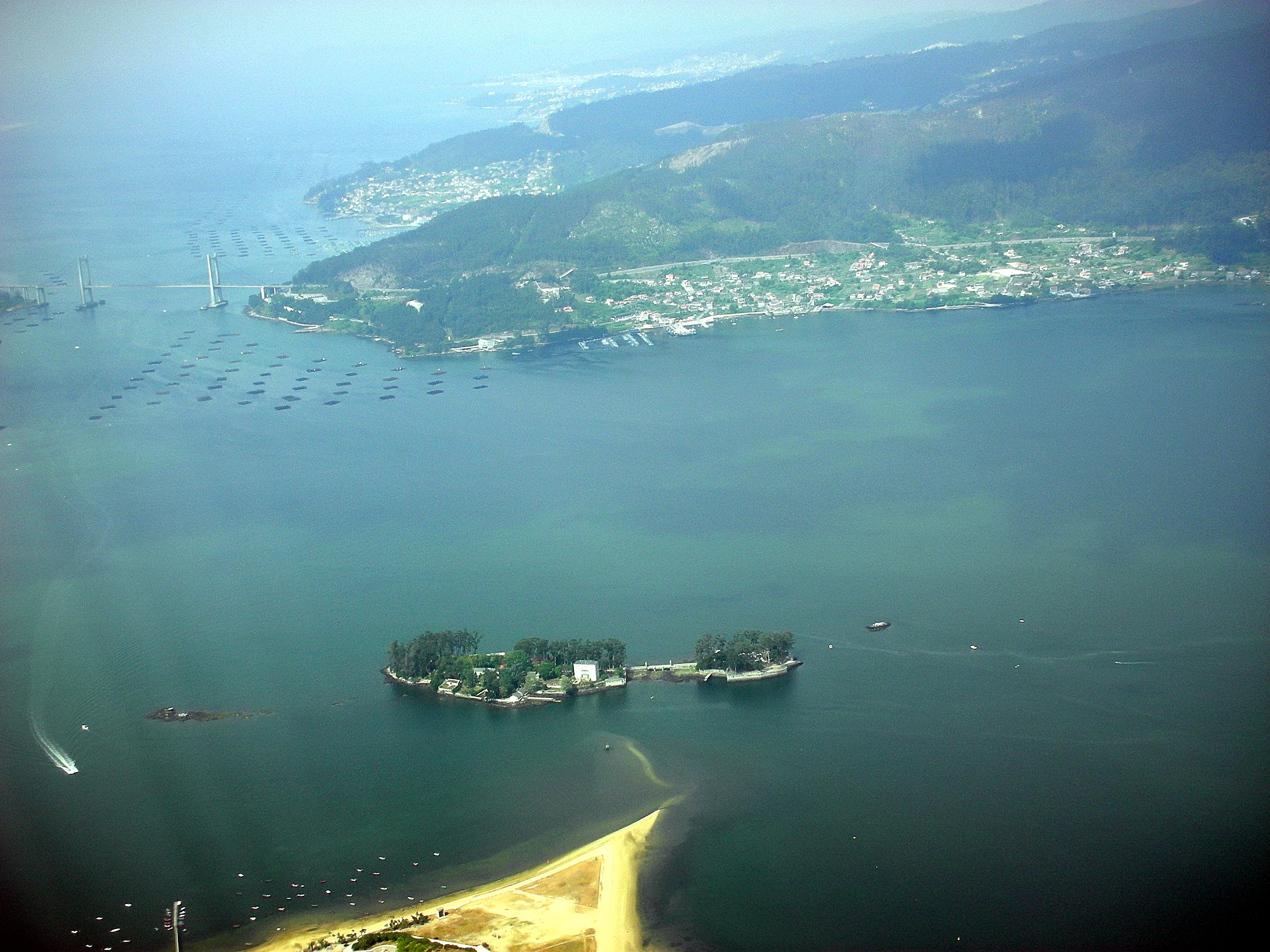
Island of San Simón, seen from the air

During the War of the Spanish Succession, the Battle of Vigo Bay was fought near San Simón between an Anglo-Dutch fleet under George Rooke and Philips van Almonde and a Franco-Spanish fleet commanded by François Louis Rousselet de Châteaurenault and Manuel de Velasco y Tejada on 23 October 1702. Rooke and van Almonde were attempting to capture the Spanish treasure fleet, and in the ensuing battle utterly annihilated Châteaurenault and Velasco's fleet, capturing or destroying all 18 of their warships. However, the treasure fleet had unloaded most of its cargo weeks earlier, which was in the process of being safely escorted to Madrid, leaving the English and Dutch chagrined. After the battle, Anglo-Dutch forces successfully raided municipalities in the Vigo estuary, including Cangas, Redondela, Vigo and Soutomaior, assisted by the weak state of Spanish forces in the region. Anglo-Dutch forces also landed on San Simón in the aftermath of the battle, who briefly occupied the island before withdrawing.

During the raids, the church of San Pedro was burnt, being only restored in the 19th century. Accounts of the whereabouts of the Franco-Spanish fleet's cargo since the battle are unclear, and numerous dives carried out after the sinking of the ships but no gold and other precious materials were found around the island. During the Peninsular War, San Simón was at times threatened by the advance of French-led troops, and the island was abandoned and re-inhabited on numerous occasions.

The continuous occupation by monastic orders was due to its beautiful geographical location, isolation and proximity to the monastery of Poyo, one of the most important monasteries of the time. However, attacks by foreign powers and civil wars contributed to instability on the island and in the region in general. There was a simultaneous conflict in Galicia, the Irmandiñas Wars. The archipelago of San Simón also bore witness to these conflicts, and Sotomayor's representative Fernando Andrade was seriously wounded. From the mid-17th century, the island was abandoned. Subsequently, by Royal Ordinance of 6 June 1838 and with the help of the Riojan merchant Velázquez Moreno, the island was converted into a leper colony (lazaretto). The island of San Antón housed the uncurable sick while San Simón housed the rest. Given the frequent quarantines to which ships on the American route were subjected, it was an indispensable element for any port that wanted to enter the long-distance sea routes, which was important for the expansion of the port of Vigo and the establishment of the Catalan canneries. Numerous cholera and leprosy epidemics from abroad were eliminated. The Leper colony was closed in 1927, and the bridge linking the island of San Antón was built; until then the only means of communication between the two islands was by sea.

=== Civil War ===
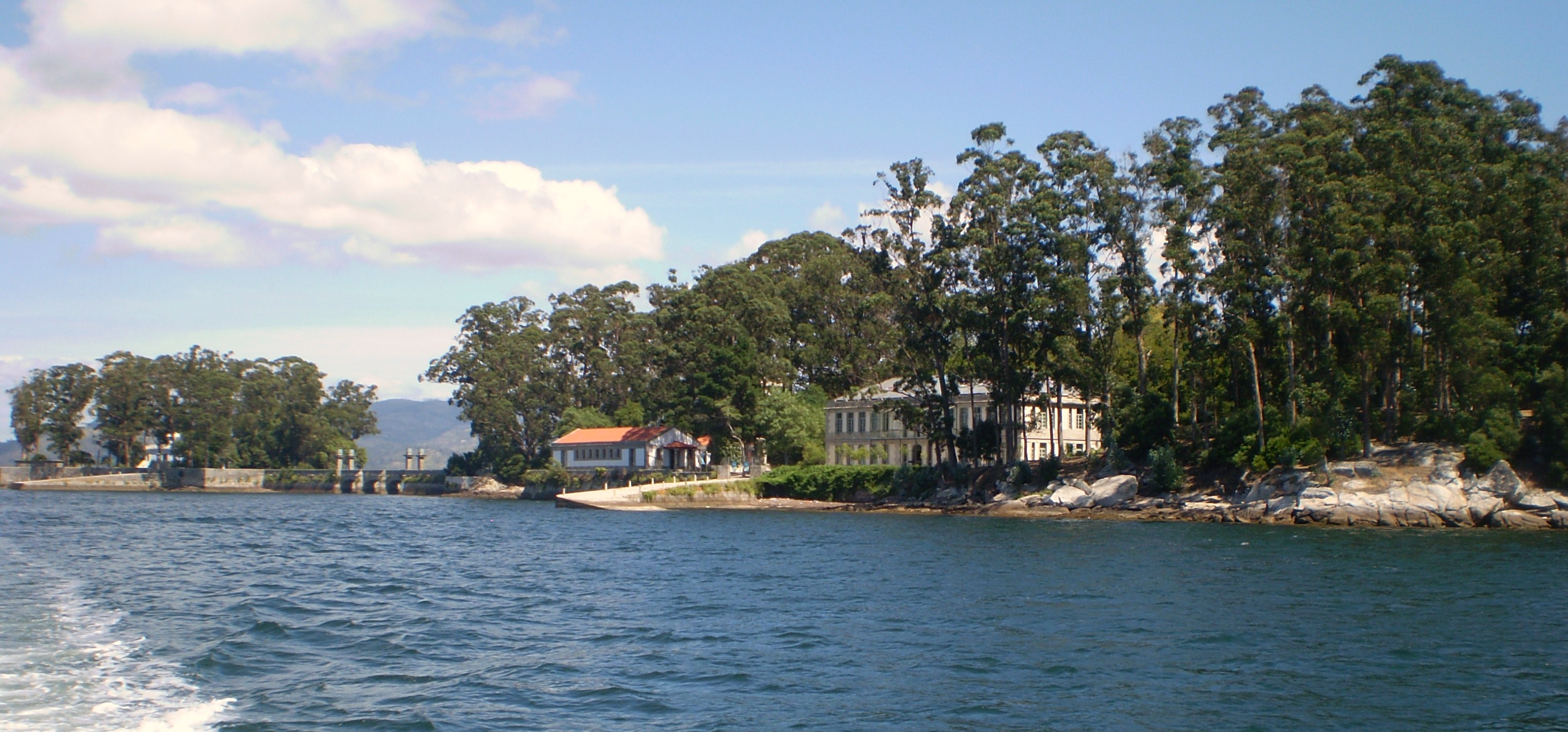
Archipelago of San Simón

From 1936, with the advent of the Spanish Civil War, the island's buildings were used as a concentration and extermination camp for political prisoners who were opposed to Francoism. At first, most of them came from nearby areas such as Vigo, Pontevedra, Province of Ourense and Vilagarcía de Arousa; after the fall of the Republican northern front, prisoners came from Asturias, León, Cantabria and the Basque Country. Once the civil war was over, prisoners were transferred from all of the prisons in Spain. It was officially classified as a penitentiary colony but it was actually a concentration camp for communist, republican, socialist and anarchist political prisoners. It remained in operation until 1943.

The former leper colony was then used to house the military personnel who guarded the island and as administrative, quartermaster or infirmary purposes. Watchtowers were built for its new functions, and the walls and entrances were improved.

The prisoners were subjected to inhumane conditions, and were distributed in different pavilions with poor sanitary and living conditions. Mass shootings were common on the island; it is estimated hundreds of political prisoners died, mostly at the hands of Falangists. The island was considered one of Franco's most fearsome prisons. In 1941 alone, 250 people died on San Simón.

All of the camp's survivors mentioned Father Nieto for his particular cruelty towards the detainees; Nieto often brandished a pistol while he coerced and insulted the inmates and forced them to go to mass under threat of death. A camp guard recounted what happened after a firing squad: "There was one who was badly wounded and dying on the ground, while Father Nieto said these words to him: 'Die, die, you impious red', beating him at the same time with his cane".

San Simón Island was the setting for the end of the film The Carpenter's Pencil, where Da Barca, a political prisoner, was transferred to the island, one of the prisons from which it was said to be almost impossible to escape alive. It also appeared in Agustín Fernández Mallo's 2021 novel The Things We've Seen, in which a novelist attends a conference held on the island.

== Buildings and facilities ==
=== Buildings ===
Residencia Stella Maris is the tallest building on the islands, with a basement, ground floor and two storeys. It was used as a residence during the time of the lazaretto, and also housed offices and the warden's living quarters when the island was used as a prison colony. Other installations are Casa de los oficios del Mar y Escuela de Vela, Acuario, Museo y Biblioteca and Edificio Multiusos.

=== Monuments ===
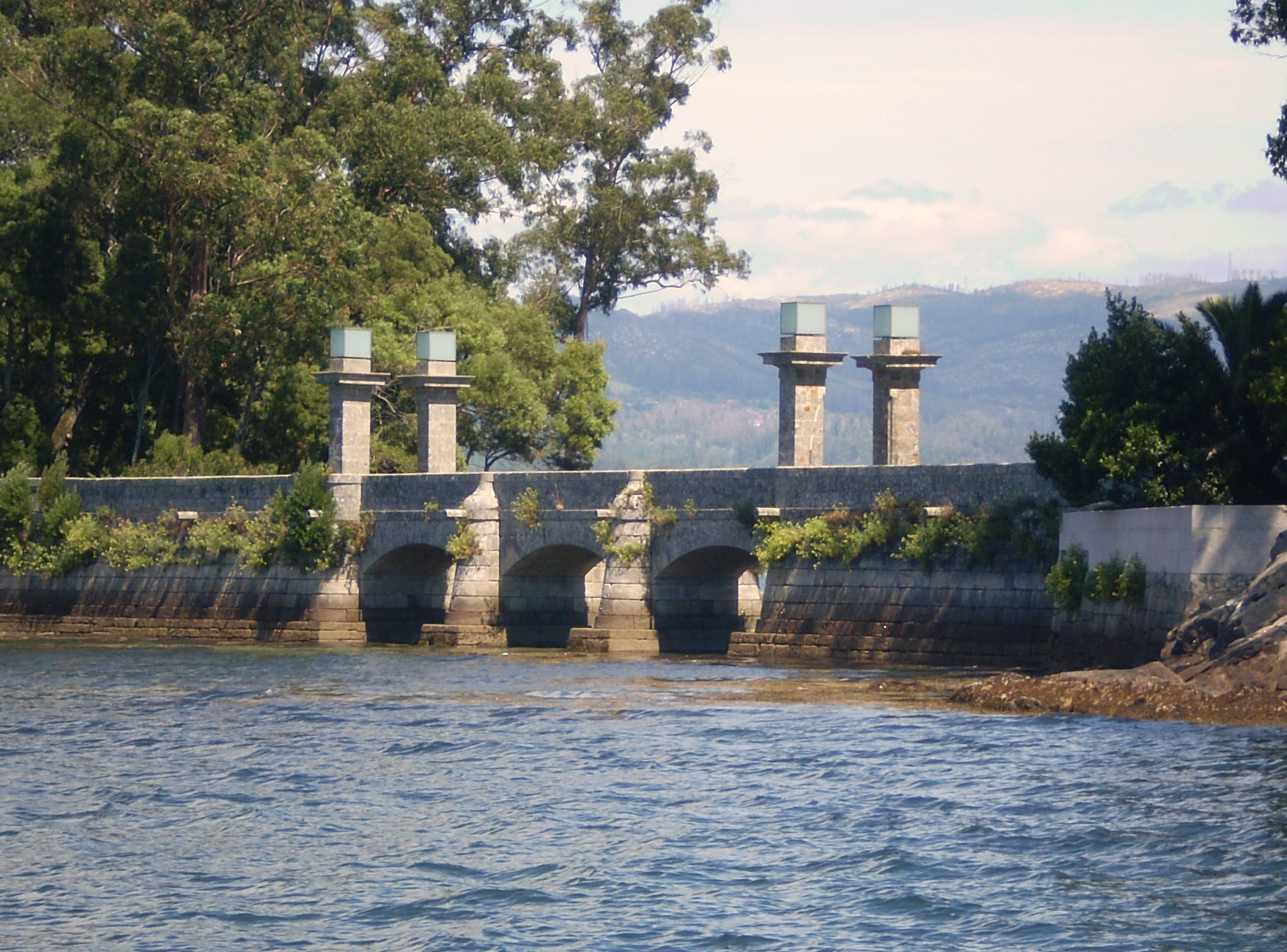
Bridge that connects the islands of San Simón and Santo Antón

In 1991, the bridge linking San Simón with San Antón was included in the catalogue of monuments of the province of Pontevedra. other monuments are Viewpoint de la boca de la ría, Viewpoint de fondo de la ría, the Chapel de San Pedro Paseo dos buxos, Paseo de árboles milenarios formando arcos, and Monumento en honor a Julio Verne.

== Bibliography ==
- GRAN ENCICLOPEDIA GALLEGA, tomo 27. Editor: Silverio Cañado; Santiago. ISBN 84-7286-215-1
- Amoedo López, Gonzalo e Gil Moure, Roberto (2007). «Episodios de terror durante a Guerra Civil na provincia de Pontevedra. A illa de San Simón». Vigo. Edicións Xerais de Galicia. ISBN 978-84-9782-604-4
- Caeiro, Antonio, González, Juan A. e de Saá, Clara Mª (1995). «A memoria dos presos de 1936 na Illa de San Simón». Vigo: Ir Indo Edicións. ISBN 84-7680-178-5
- Fernández de la Cigoña, Estanislao (1991). «Illas de Galicia. Cíes, Ons, Sálvora, Tambo, San Simón e Cortegada». Vigo. Edicións Xerais de GaliciaISBN 84-7507-582-7
- Varios (1997). «Estudio da Ensenada de San Simón». Pontevedra. Deputación de Pontevedra. ISBN 84-89690-22-7
- Varios (2002). «Redondela. Enseada de San Simón / Val do Verdugo / Val do Oitavén». Santiago de Compostela. Xunta de Galicia. ISBN 84-453-3191-4
