= Albarran =

Albarran may refer to:

- Albarrán, Spanish-language surname
- Pierre Albarran (1893–1960), French Olympic tennis player, and auction and contract bridge player and theorist
