= Island of San Antón (Pontevedra) =

Spanish island

Coordinates: 42°18′34″N 8°37′46″E

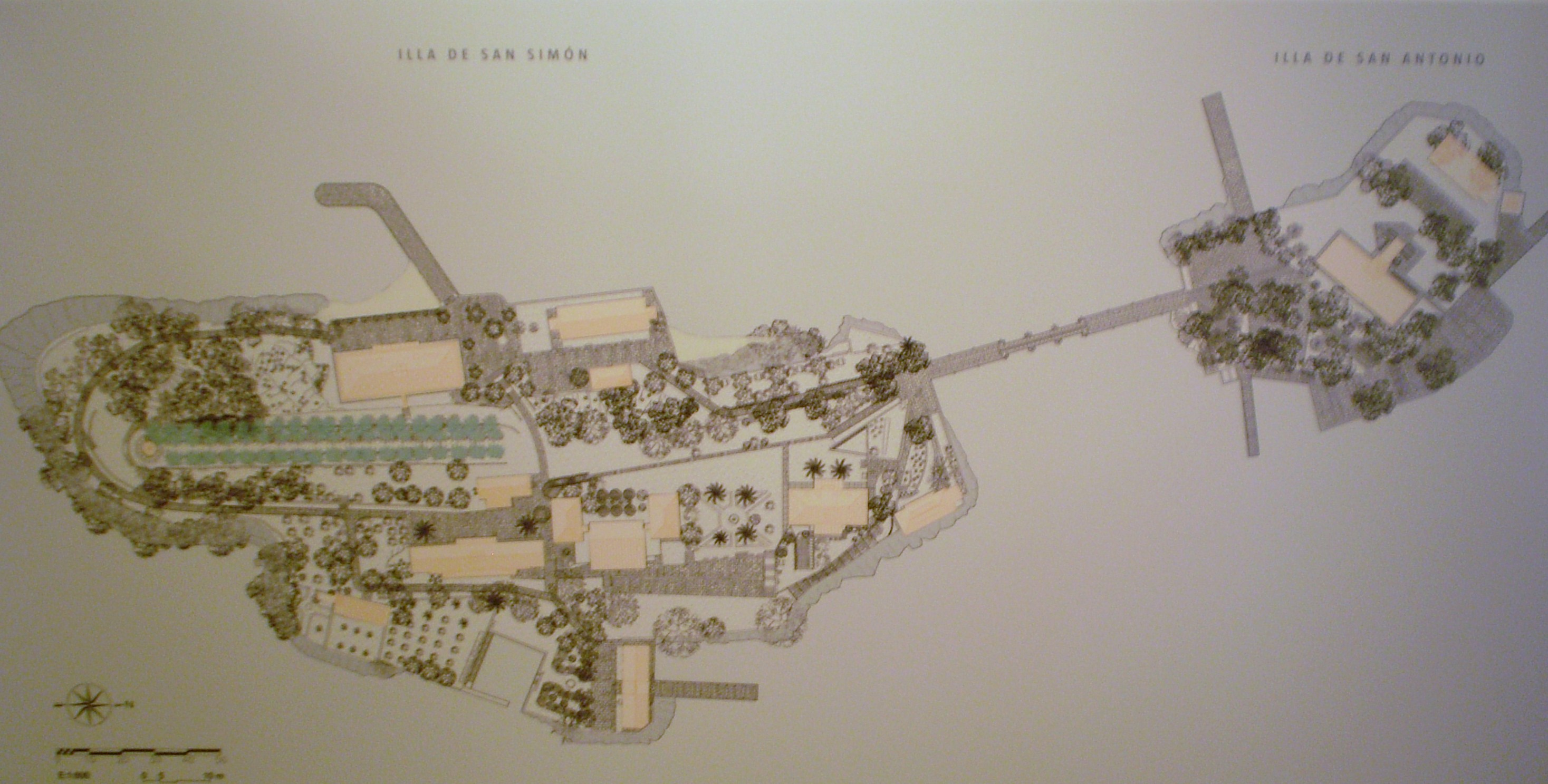
Map of the archipelago of San Simón

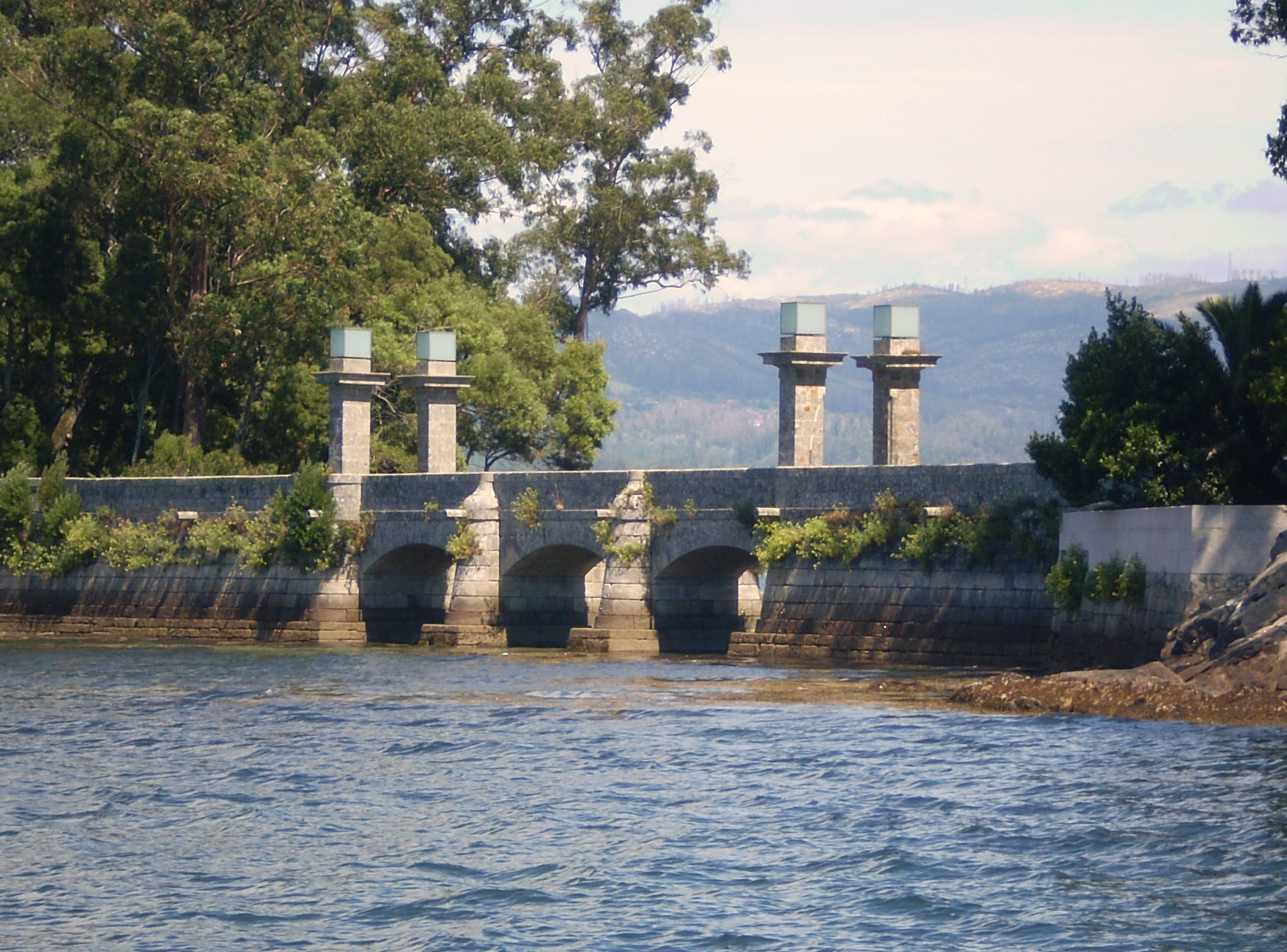
Bridge that connects the islands of San Simón and San Antón

The Island of San Antón (Illa de San Antón in Galician), also called San Antonio, is a Spanish Island in the province of Pontevedra off the coast of the municipality of Redondela, connected to the Island of San Simón by a monumental three-sided bridge.

Between 1596 and 1601, the Benedictine monks of Poio used the island as a refuge from the plague, which especially affected the Pontevedra area.

In 1838 the island (which measures just 1.2 hectares was converted into a maritime lazaret or "leper colony" to control infections, isolate patients from deadly and highly contagious epidemics and serve as a transit point for the crew of ships destined for the Galician coast to quarantine there.

Its lazaretto was classified as a dirty lazaretto, while the one at the neighbour island San Simón was classified as a so-called clean one. The lazaretto was closed definitively in 1927. The building, which is still preserved, along with other buildings, among the eucalyptus trees that cover the island, was used as a prison from 1936 to 1940 for opponents of the military uprising of General Francisco Franco. In 1941 about 250 people died there.

Later, all the buildings on the two islands were used for their activities by the Spanish Youth Organisation (Organización Juvenil Española).

In the year 2021 the island was uninhabited and since 1999 it has been considered an Asset of Cultural Interest with the category of "Historic Site".
