= Gallegos (disambiguation) =

Gallegos may refer to:

== People ==
- Gallegos, a common Spanish surname for "those from Galicia"

== Places ==
- Gallegos (Mieres), parish in Mieres, Asturias, Spain
- Gallegos, Segovia, village and municipality in the province of Segovia, Spain
- Gallegos de Solmirón, village and municipality in the province of Salamanca, Spain
- Río Gallegos, city in Santa Cruz, Argentina
- San Felices de los Gallegos, village and municipality in the province of Salamanca, Spain

== Other ==
- Gallegos River, in the province of Santa Cruz, Argentina
- Rómulo Gallegos Prize, Venezuelan prize for literature

== See also ==
- Gallego (disambiguation)
