= Albarrán =

Albarrán is a Spanish surname. Notable people with the surname include:

- Arturo Albarrán (born 1979), Mexican-born Salvadoran footballer
- Herminia Albarrán Romero, American artist
- Joaquín Albarrán (1860–1912), Cuban urologist
- Aniceto de Castro Albarrán (1896–1981), Spanish priest and writer
- Gerardo Villanueva Albarrán (born 1972), Mexican politician
