= Vilar de Infesta =

Civil parish in Galicia, Spain

Coordinates: 42°14′8.14″N 8°37′14.72″W

Vilar de Infesta is a parish in Redondela, Pontevedra Province, Spain.
