= Negros, Redondela =

Parish in Redondela, Spain

Coordinates: 42°16′N 8°37′W

Negros is a parish in Redondela, Pontevedra Province, Spain.
