= José Rafael Gallegos =

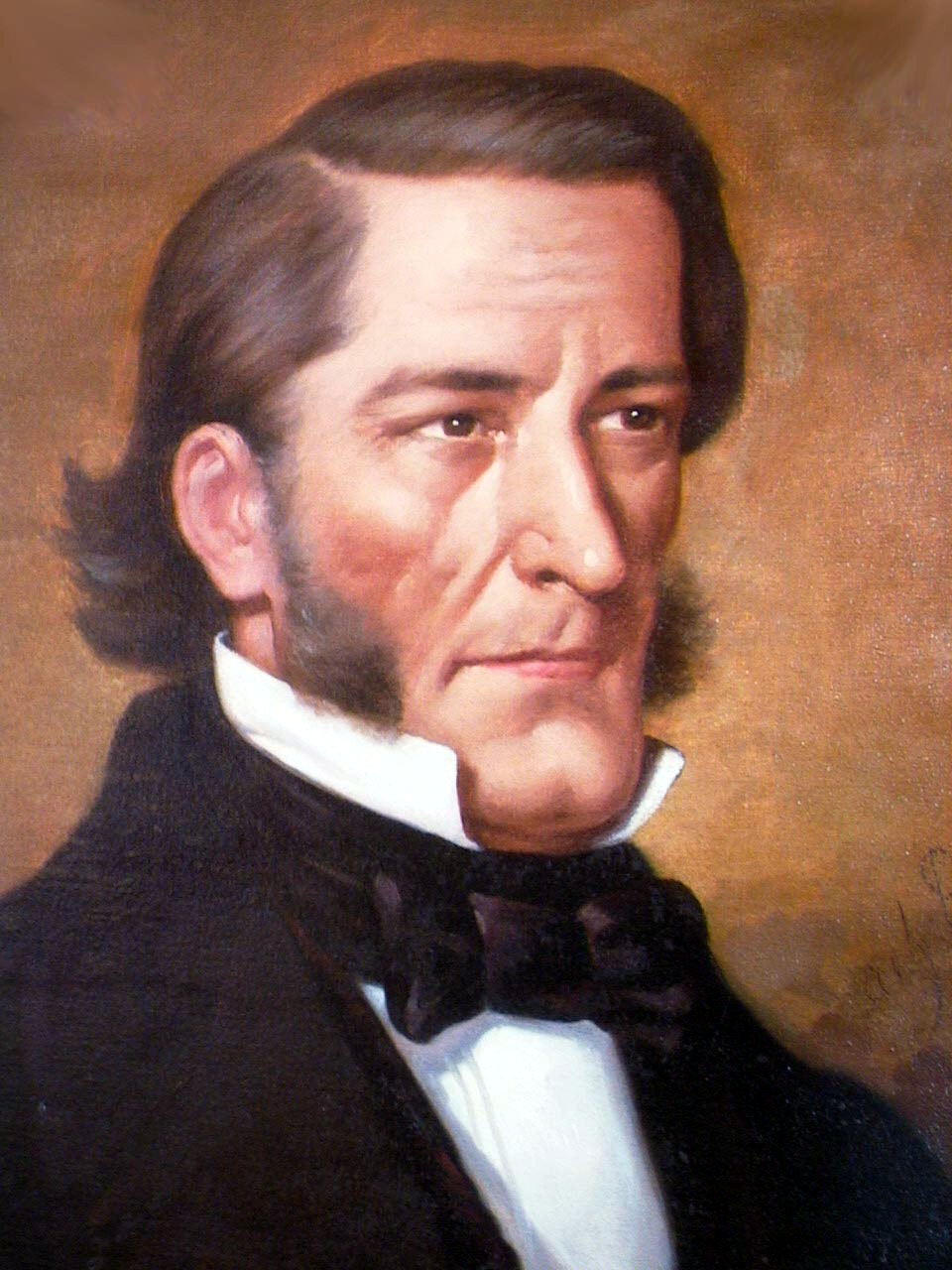
José Rafael Gallegos Alvarado

José Rafael de Gallegos y Alvarado (31 October 1784, Cesantes, Spain – 14 August 1850) was president of Costa Rica's Junta Superior Gubernativa from October 1822 to January 1823 and head of state of Costa Rica from March 1833 until March 1835 and again from May 1845 to June 1846.

He was elected president by the legislature, even though his opponent won more electoral votes. He resigned from the presidency under criticism and has been characterized as an "ineffectual" president.

José Rafael Gallegos was born in Cesantes, Redondela in Galician Spain but moved with his parents to Cartago, Costa Rica at the age of 8 where his parents settled to farm and raise cattle. A widower before marrying Ignacia Sáenz y Ulloa in 1822. He had eight children from his second marriage. He supported the Jesuits.

Political offices
Preceded by Juan Mora	Head of State of Costa Rica; 1833–1835	Succeeded by Braulio Carrillo
Preceded by Francisco María Oreamuno	Head of State of Costa Rica; 1845–1846	Succeeded by José María Alfaro
