= José Gallego =

José Gallego may refer to:

- José Ramón Gallego (born 1959), Spanish footballer
- José Gallego (footballer, born 1923), Spanish footballer
- José Antonio Gallego (1942–2026), Spanish politician
- Pepete (José Gallego Mateo) (1883–1910), Spanish matador

== See also ==
- José Gallegos (disambiguation)
