= Ignacia Sáenz y Ulloa =

First Lady of Costa Rica

Ignacia Sáenz y Ulloa (July 31, 1800 – February 18, 1873) was the First Lady of Costa Rica from 1822 to 1823 and from 1833 to 1835, and the wife of José Rafael Gallegos Alvarado, Costa Rica's Head of State for two separate terms.

== Biography ==
Doña Ignacia married José Rafael Gallegos in 1822. She gave birth to eight children. One son, Rafael Gallegos Sáenz (born May 1831) later became a prominent businessman and politician, serving in the administration of Bruno Carranza Ramírez as the Secretary of Finance and Commerce.

In 1872, Doña Ignacia and her three unmarried daughters moved to San Francisco, California, where she died the following year.
