= Eva Ramón Gallegos =

Mexican scientist

- Born: San Juan Bautista Tuxtepec
- Education: Instituto Politécnico Nacional
- Occupation: Medical doctor

Eva Ramón Gallegos is a Mexican scientist, professor, and researcher at the Escuela Nacional de Ciencias Biológicas of the Instituto Politécnico Nacional. Her field of specialty is in biomedical sciences and nanobiotechnology. Her main line of research is the search for non-invasive treatments for the eradication of uterine cervical cancer produced by the human papillomavirus (HPV) using photodynamic therapies.

== Biography ==
With the researcher Elizabeth Maldonado, and after 20 years of research, Eva Ramón Gallegos developed a method by which the human papillomavirus could be detected in women economically and efficiently. The technique has a precision of 98 percent, and it is based on the analysis of the roughness of the skin and the modifications that occur when there are benign, premalignant, and malignant lesions. The research results were published in 2005 in Physics in Medicine and Biology. In 2017, Gallegos was part of a team that determined the effectiveness of photodynamic therapy in eliminating HPV-16 and HPV-18.

== Publications ==
- Roblero-Bartolón GV & Ramón-Gallegos E. 2015. Uso de nanopartículas (NP) en la terapia fotodinámica (photodynamic therapy [PDT]) contra el cáncer. Gac Med Mex. 151: 85-98. ISSN 0016-3813.
- Bermeo-Escalona JR, González-López BS, Ramón-Gallegos E& H Mendieta-Zeron. 2014. Effectiveness of Toki's criteria and determination of variables for identification of HPV L1 protein in oral lesions. Med Oral Patol Oral Cir Bucal. 19 (6): e538-44. doi:10.4317/medoral.19748. ISSN 1698-6946.
- Muñoz-Cadena CE, Lina-Manjarrez P, Estrada-Izquierdo I & Ramón-Gallegos E. 2012. An approach to litter generation and littering practices in a Mexico City neighborhood. Sustainability. 4 (8): 1733-1754. doi:10.3390/su4081733. ISSN 2071-1050.

== Awards ==
- Biennial Award of the Fundación Mexicana para la Salud for the publication of Implementación y análisis de patrones de relieve de la superficie de lesiones benignas y malignas de la piel por microtopografía.
- Legislative Assembly of the Federal District Medal of Merit in Science and Technology of the Federal District 2012.
