= Gallegos, Segovia =

Gallegos
- Municipality
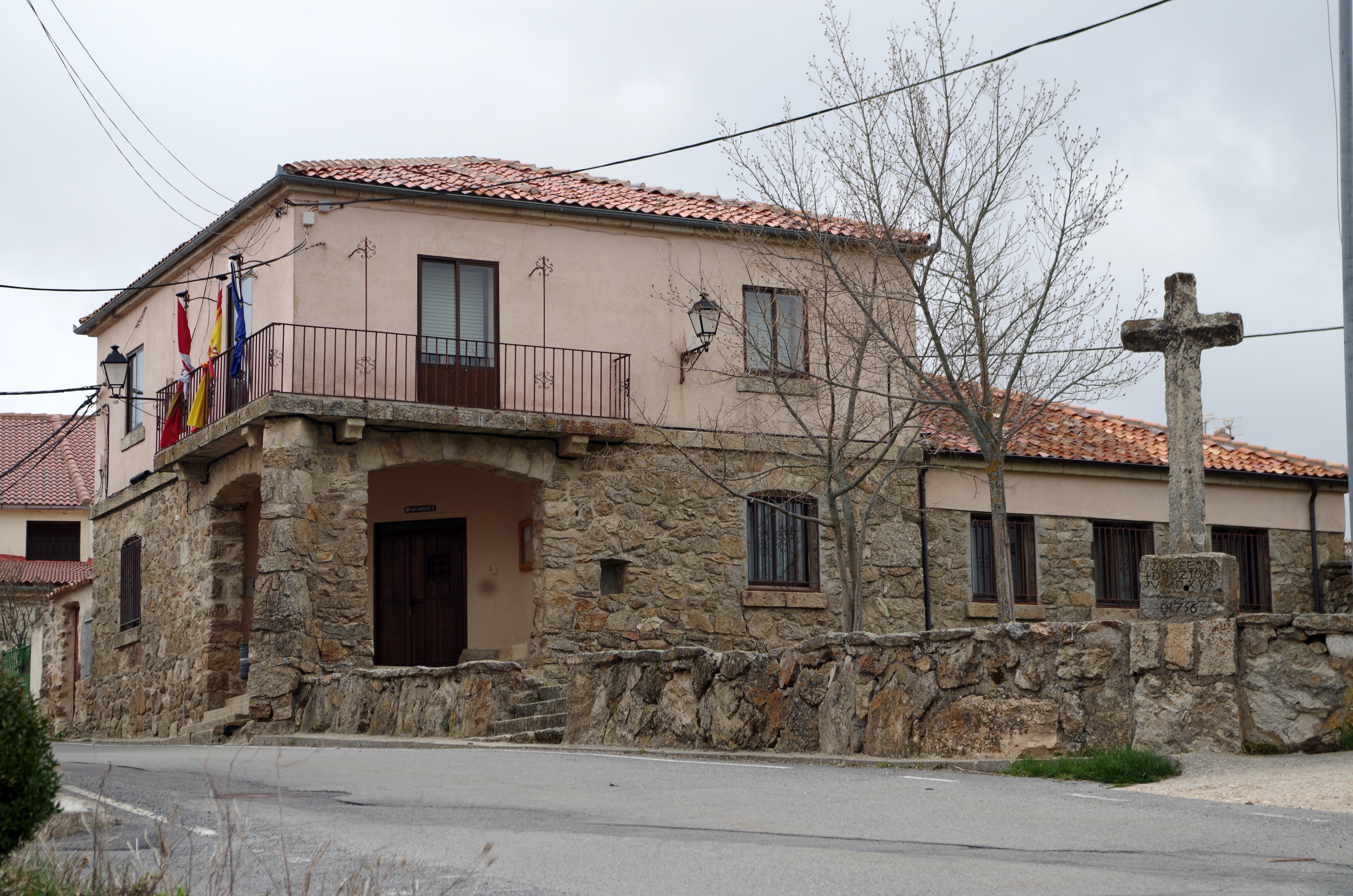
- Town hall

- Location in Spain. Gallegos (Spain)
- Coordinates: 41°04′28″N 3°47′09″W
- Country: Spain
- Community: Castile and León
- Province: Segovia

Area
  - Total: 21.80 km^{2} (8.42 sq mi)
- Elevation: 1,242 m (4,075 ft)

Population (2025-01-01)
  - Total: 96
  - Density: 4.4/km^{2} (11/sq mi)
- Time zone: UTC+1 (CET)
  - Summer (DST): UTC+2 (CEST)
- Website: Official website

Gallegos is a municipality located in the province of Segovia, Castile and León, Spain.
