= Deborah E. Gallegos =

Deborah Gallegos was the Chief Investment Officer for the Comptroller of the City of New York during 2005.

== Education ==
Gallegos holds an MBA from the Haas School of Business at the University of California, Berkeley.

== Career ==
Gallegos worked as Deputy State Investment Officer for the New Mexico State Investment Council, prior to her post in the City of New York. In New Mexico, she oversaw a $1 billion private equity program and worked with the governor on investing $11.8 billion in assets. Before that, she worked in the private sector with stints at Callan Associates (a pension fund consulting firm), Morgan Stanley, and J.P. Morgan Fleming Asset Management.

As Chief Investment Officer for the City of New York, she supervised investments for New York City's five pension funds, worth about $85 billion in assets. The systems fund retirements for the city's civil servants, teachers, firemen, police officers, and board of education.
