= Ramón Gallegos Nava =

Mexican psychologist and writer

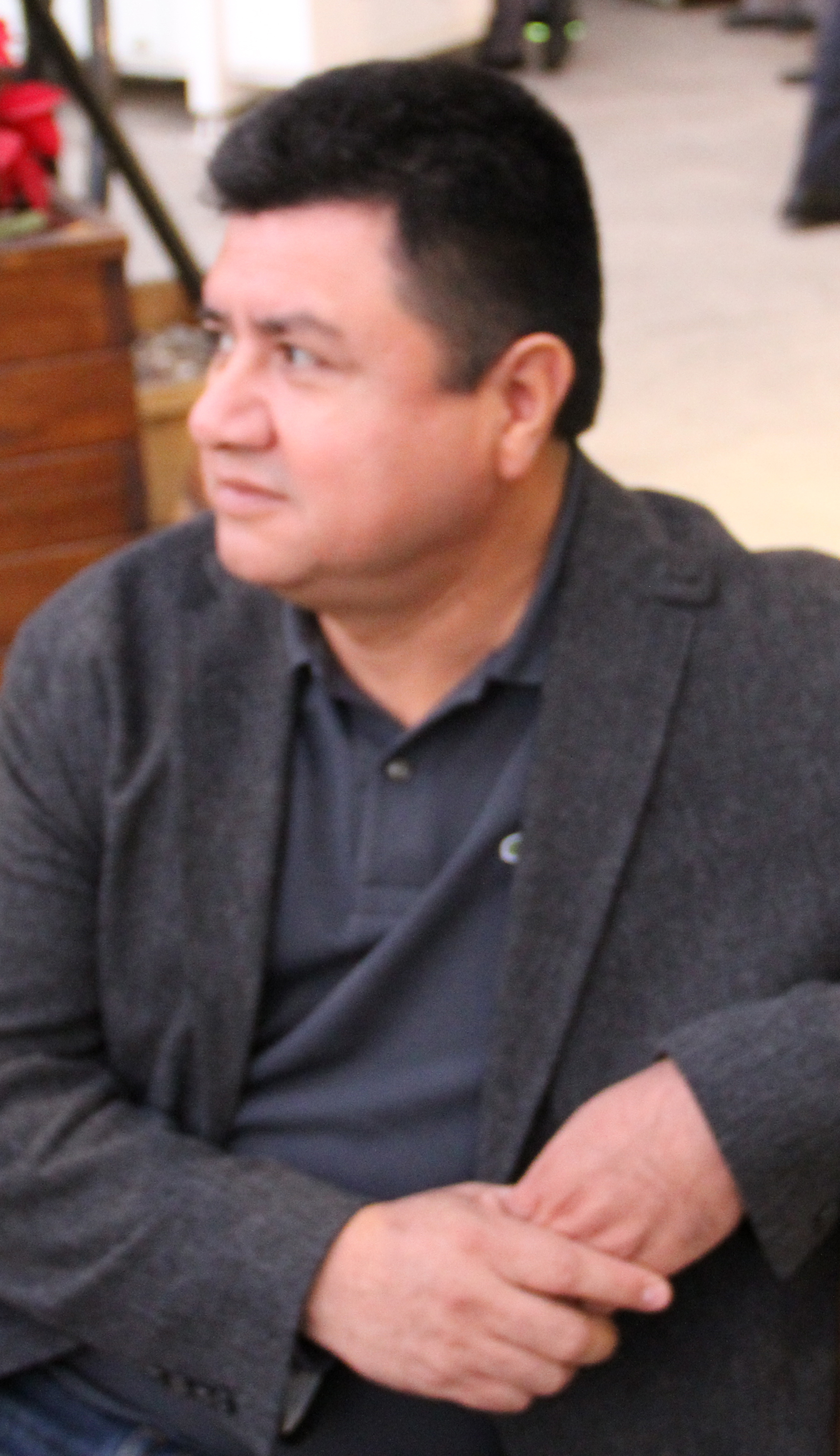
- Ramón Gallegos Nava
- Born: November 16, 1959 (age 65); Baja California, Mexico
- Education: PhD in Education
- Occupation(s): writer, educator, philosopher
- Awards: ANUIES 1996, Book of the Year 2001
- Website: ramongallegos.com

Ramón Gallegos Nava (born November 16, 1959) is a Mexican psychologist and writer. He is author of Educación Holista (1999, Holistic Education, English version 2001). He studied psychology and sociology in college, and received his PhD in education. He is an author in genres such as education and spirituality. His most-known works are in the field of holistic education and spiritual intelligence. Ramon Gallegos has also developed new educative models, such as the Holistic Educative Multinivel-Multidimension model, the Learning Communities Model, and the Holistic Model of Spiritual Intelligence.

== Biography ==
He was born in North Baja California, Mexico. He lived his childhood in the border zone between Tijuana and San Diego, but lived most of the time north in East Los Angeles. He moved to Guadalajara, Mexico, at age of 12. His interest for education and spirituality have followed him since childhood. Inspired by the Advaita Vedanta philosophy, he has maintained a serious meditative and indagative practice that led him to develop an educative paradigm focused in spiritual awareness, social integration and holistic education.

He was full-time professor and researched at the University of Guadalajara, as well as graduate-programs coordinator. He also became an invited researcher in 1986 at the University of California, Los Angeles (UCLA) where he studied the psychology and religion of Mexican immigrants. This research was later published. In 1996, he received the ANUIES award for his work "Quantum Project: an Universitarian Model for a Sustainable Society". In 2001, he received the international "Book of the Year 2001" award for his book Holistic Education, Pedagogy of universal love.

He is the founder and former president of the International Foundation for Holistic Education. He also offers courses, graduate programs, conferences and seminars about holistic education, spiritual intelligence and Advaita Vedanta. Gallegos coordinates the Master, PhD and Postdoctoral programs in Holistic Education and Spiritual Intelligence at the International Foundation for Holistic Education.

== Published Books ==
- Los 12 factores de la Inteligencia Espiritual: Las capacidades transpersonales del Ser (The 12 Factors of Spiritual Intelligence: The transpersonal capacities of Being)
- Enseñanzas Espirituales: Escuchando la voz de la verdad (Spiritual Teachings: Listening to the voice of truth)
- La Investigación Holista: 100 abstracts de estudios integrales (Holistic Research: 100 abstracts of comprehensive studies) (2014)
- Educación Holista: Pedagogía del Amor Universal (2001, 2013, 2015), available in English: Holistic Education: Pedagogy of Universal Love (2015)
- Comunidades de Aprendizaje: Transformando las escuelas en comunidades que aprenden (Learning Communities: Transforming schools into communities that learn) (2003, 2015)
- Una Visión Integral de la Educación: El Corazón de la Educación Holista (An Integral Vision of Education: The Heart of Holistic Education) (2015)
- Aprender a Ser: El nacimiento de una nueva conciencia espiritual) (Learn to Be: The rise of a new spiritual awareness) (2003)
- El Espíritu de la Educación: Integridad y trascendencia en Educación Holista (The Spirit of Education: Integrity and Transcendence in Holistic Education) (2000, 2013, 2015)
- Meditación Holista: El camino directo a la Felicidad (Holistic Meditation: The Direct Path to Happiness) (2014)
- La Felicidad como Realidad Educativa: Aprendiendo a ser Feliz (Happiness as an Educational Reality: Learning to Be Happy)
- La Educación que la Humanidad Necesita: Educación Holista, el paradigma del siglo XXI (The Education that Humanity Needs: Holistic Education, the paradigm of the 21st century) (2008)
- En Unidad con el Ser: Inteligencia Espiritual I (In Unity with Being: Spiritual Intelligence I) (2010)
- La Conciencia Iluminada: Inteligencia Espiritual II (Illuminated Consciousness: Spiritual Intelligence II) (2010)
- El Néctar de la Felicidad: Inteligencia Espiritual III (The Nectar of Happiness: Spiritual Intelligence III) (2010)
- Educación y Espiritualidad: La educación como práctica espiritual (Education and Spirituality: Education as a Spiritual Practice) (2005, 2015)
- Educación para la Vida y la Paz: Más allá de la Calidad Educativa (Education for Life and Peace: Beyond Educational Quality) (2008)
- Inteligencia Espiritual: Más allá de las inteligencias múltiples y emocional (Spiritual Intelligence: Beyond Multiple and Emotional Intelligences) (2006)
- Diálogos Holistas: Educación Holista y Filosofía Perenne I (Holistic Dialogues: Holistic Education and Perennial Philosophy I) (2004)
- Sabiduría, Amor y Compasión: Educación Holista y Filosofía Perenne II (Wisdom, Love and Compassion: Holistic Education and Perennial Philosophy II) (2004)
- El Camino de la Filosofía Perenne: Educación Holista y Filosofía Perenne III (The Path of Perennial Philosophy: Holistic Education and Perennial Philosophy III) (2004)
- Pedagogía del Amor Universal: Una visión holista del mundo (Pedagogy of Universal Love: A Holistic Vision of the World) (2003)
- La Educación del Corazón: Doce principios para las escuelas holistas (Education of the Heart: Twelve Principles for Holistic Schools) (2001)
- Religion y psicologia en emigrantes mexicanos (Religion and psychology in Mexican emigrants) (1996)
- One Consciousness (1997)
- The Indivisible Destiny of Education (1997)
- The Sacred and the New Science (1998)
- Where do we go (1998)
