= Alice Halstead =

English soprano singer

- Born: England
- Occupation: Soprano
- Years active: 2000s–present
- Website: www.alicehalstead.com

Alice Halstead is an English soprano based in London.

As a chorister at St. Alphege Church, Solihull, she won the title of "BBC Radio 2 Young Chorister of the Year 2008" in front of an audience of over 1,000 people at St. Paul's Cathedral, London, in October 2008. Halstead has since performed on UK national radio and television.

She appeared on BBC One Songs of Praise on 22 February 2009 and 16 August 2009 singing "Ave Maria" by Michael Head and appeared on 27 September 2009 singing "He Shall Feed His Flock" from Handel's Messiah.

She recorded excerpts from the Messiah for BBC Radio 2 at St. Paul's Cathedral with the BBC Concert Orchestra in front of an audience of over 2,000 people, which was broadcast on Good Friday, 2009. She has made several recordings for BBC Radio 2 Good Morning Sunday with Aled Jones, Sunday Half Hour and Friday Night Is Music Night in London, Belfast, Manchester and Wells Cathedral. She sang "O for the Wings of a Dove" live in Birmingham Town Hall as part of BBC Radio 3's Mendelssohn weekend in May 2009 and has led the singing for BBC Radio 4's The Daily Service and Sunday Worship.

Halstead has recorded solos for John Rutter's Visions and Requiem (2016) and for Karl Jenkins's Stella Natalis (2009).

From 2012 to 2016, Halstead sang under Graham Ross in the Choir of Clare College, Cambridge.
