= Joan Vilar i Costa =

- Born: 1889; Manresa, Spain
- Died: 1962 (aged 72–73); Toulouse, France
- Occupations: Ecclesiastical writer, librarian, government official
- Known for: Author of Als Catalans (1944); Propaganda Commission official during Spanish Civil War

Joan Vilar i Costa (1889–1962) was an ecclesiastical writer. He joined the Jesuits and was librarian of the Pontifical Biblical Institute in Rome. Leaving that position, he joined the diocesan clergy.

Costa was born in Manresa. During the Spanish Civil War, he was a senior official of the government's Propaganda Commission.

In exile he exercised a popular ministry. He died in Toulouse.

He published Als Catalans (1944) which advocated debate and elections for future Catalan national reconstruction.
