= Margarita Gallegos Soto =

Mexican politician

- Born: 19 October 1962 (age 63); Aguascalientes, Mexico
- Occupation: Politician
- Political party: PRI

Margarita Gallegos Soto (born 19 October 1962) is a Mexican politician from the Institutional Revolutionary Party. From 2009 to 2012 she served as Deputy of the LXI Legislature of the Mexican Congress representing Aguascalientes.
