= Justin Gallegos =

American runner

Justin Gallegos (born 24 August 1998) is a professional runner with cerebral palsy. In June 2016, he won gold in the 400 meters in the Paralympics-Ambulatory division at the California State Track & Field Championships. He was featured by Runner's World magazine as one of their 2017 Heroes of Running.

He raced the one mile in track and the 8k in cross country on the University of Oregon club team. He completed his first half marathon in May 2018 and in October 2018, he became the first professional athlete with cerebral palsy to sign a contract with Nike. He completed his first marathon at the Chicago Marathon on October 13, 2019, with a time of 4:49:30.
