= Gallego =

Gallego may refer to:

- Gallego (surname)
- Galician language, spoken in northwestern Spain
- Gállego (river), a tributary of the Ebro river in the north of Spain
- Del Gallego, Camarines Sur, a municipality in the Philippines
- Gallego (footballer), Francisco Fernández Rodríguez (born 1944), Spanish football player
- The Galician horse
- The fish Squalius carolitertii
- A person from Galicia, Spain
- Gallego (ship), a navio in Columbus's fourth voyage

== See also ==
- Gallegos (disambiguation)
- Santa María (ship), one of the ships of Christopher Columbus's fleet, also known as La Gallega
