= Carlos Gallegos =

Mexican boxer (born 1992)

Personal information
- Nickname: El Zeta
- Born: Carlos Gallegos; 28 May 1992 (age 34) Monterrey, Nuevo León, Mexico
- Height: 6 ft 3 in (1.91 m)
- Weight: Super middleweight

Boxing career
- Reach: 197 cm (78 in)
- Stance: Orthodox

Boxing record
- Total fights: 8
- Wins: 4
- Win by KO: 3
- Losses: 4
- Draws: 0
- No contests: 0

Carlos Gallegos (born 28 May 1992) is a Mexican professional boxer.

== Amateur career ==
Carlos had an amateur career record of 37–3. He went on to win a bronze medal at the 2008 Cadet Mexican National Championships and a gold medal at the Mexican National Championships in the middleweight division.

== Professional career ==
On 2 October 2010, Gallegos beat the veteran Miguel Angel Galindo at the Estadio de Beisbol in Monterrey, Nuevo León, Mexico.
