= Rocío Reza Gallegos =

Mexican politician

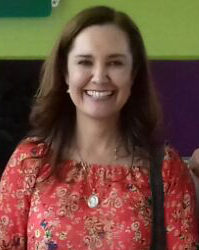
- Born: 19 April 1968 (age 58); Ciudad Cuauhtémoc, Chihuahua, Mexico
- Occupation: Deputy
- Political party: PAN

Rocío Esmeralda Reza Gallegos (born 19 April 1968) is a Mexican politician affiliated with the PAN. As of 2013 she served as Deputy of the LXII Legislature of the Mexican Congress representing Chihuahua.
