= Joseph Shalom Gallego =

Jewish poet and hazzan (d. 1624)

Joseph Shalom de Shalom Gallego (Hebrew: יוסף שלום בן שלום גלייגו; died 25 November 1624) was a Hebrew poet and ḥazzan.

== Biography ==
Originally from Salonika, Gallego moved to Amsterdam around 1614, where he served for fourteen years as the first ḥazzan of the city's first synagogue, Beth Jacob. According to some sources, he later moved to the Land of Israel.

He edited the collection Imre No'am, containing religious poems, hymns, and elegies (Amsterdam, 1628), many of which were set to melodies of Ladino folk songs. Several of his Hebrew poems are also to be found in the manuscript collection Kol tefillah ve-kol zimrah of David Franco Mendes. Gallego translated from Hebrew into Spanish the ethical writings of Jonah de Gerona, under the title Sendroe [Sendero] de Vidas (Amsterdam, n.d.; 2d ed., Amsterdam, 1640).

== Publications ==
- Sefer Imre No'am. Amsterdam: Menasseh ben Israel. 1628.
- Sendroe de Vidas. Amsterdam: Ioseph Bueno & Ioseph da Costa. n.d.
