= José Antonio Gallego =

Spanish politician (1942–2026)

Member of the Congress of Deputies for Murcia
- In office 5 April 2000 – 20 January 2004
- In office 8 February 1983 – 13 January 1984

Member of the Senate of Spain for Murcia
- In office 6 June 1993 – 18 January 2000

Personal details
- Born: José Antonio Gallego López; 11 November 1942 Valencia, Spain
- Died: 16 January 2026 (aged 83)
- Party: PSOE
- Occupation: Philosopher

José Antonio Gallego López (11 November 1942 – 16 January 2026) was a Spanish politician. A member of the Spanish Socialist Workers' Party, he served in the Congress of Deputies from 1983 to 1984 and from 2000 to 2004, and was a member of the Senate from 1993 to 2000. He was mayor of Lorca between 1983 and 1993.

Gallego died on 16 January 2026, at the age of 83.
