= Aniceto de Castro Albarrán =

Spanish priest and writer (1896–1981)

Aniceto de Castro Albarrán (1896 in Martinez (Province of Ávila) – 1981 in Madrid), was a Spanish priest and writer. Having studied at the Pontifical University of Comillas he shortly after became assistant canon of Salamanca.

He won notoriety as the author of El derecho a la rebeldia (Madrid, 1934) a theological defence of armed rebellion. His book was serialised in the Carlist press, published under the usual ecclesiastical licences. A noted preacher, his services were much in demand among Salamanca's conservative circles. After the outbreak of the Spanish Civil War Castro Albarrán was one of the first to set out, in a systematic way, " the theology of the Crusade". On 15 August 1936 he gave a talk on Nationalist radio entitled, The lawfulness of the armed uprising. He used Thomist arguments for the justification of a holy war, arguing that the Spanish Second Republic had been 'a tyranny, an anarchy, a revolution.' " Our war is holy. Our battle cry will be that of the Crusades: God wills it. Long live Catholic Spain." In an extraordinary allocution in Salamanca Cathedral in August 1936 he declared that, "The avenging, purifying Falange, like the Angel of Paradise, sacrifices on the altar of Spain not only the enemies of the Fatherland but also their accomplices."

In 1938 he published Guerra santa ('Holy War'), with a prologue by the integrist Isidro Goma y Tomas.
