= Cesantes =

Coordinates: 42.310°N 8.612°W

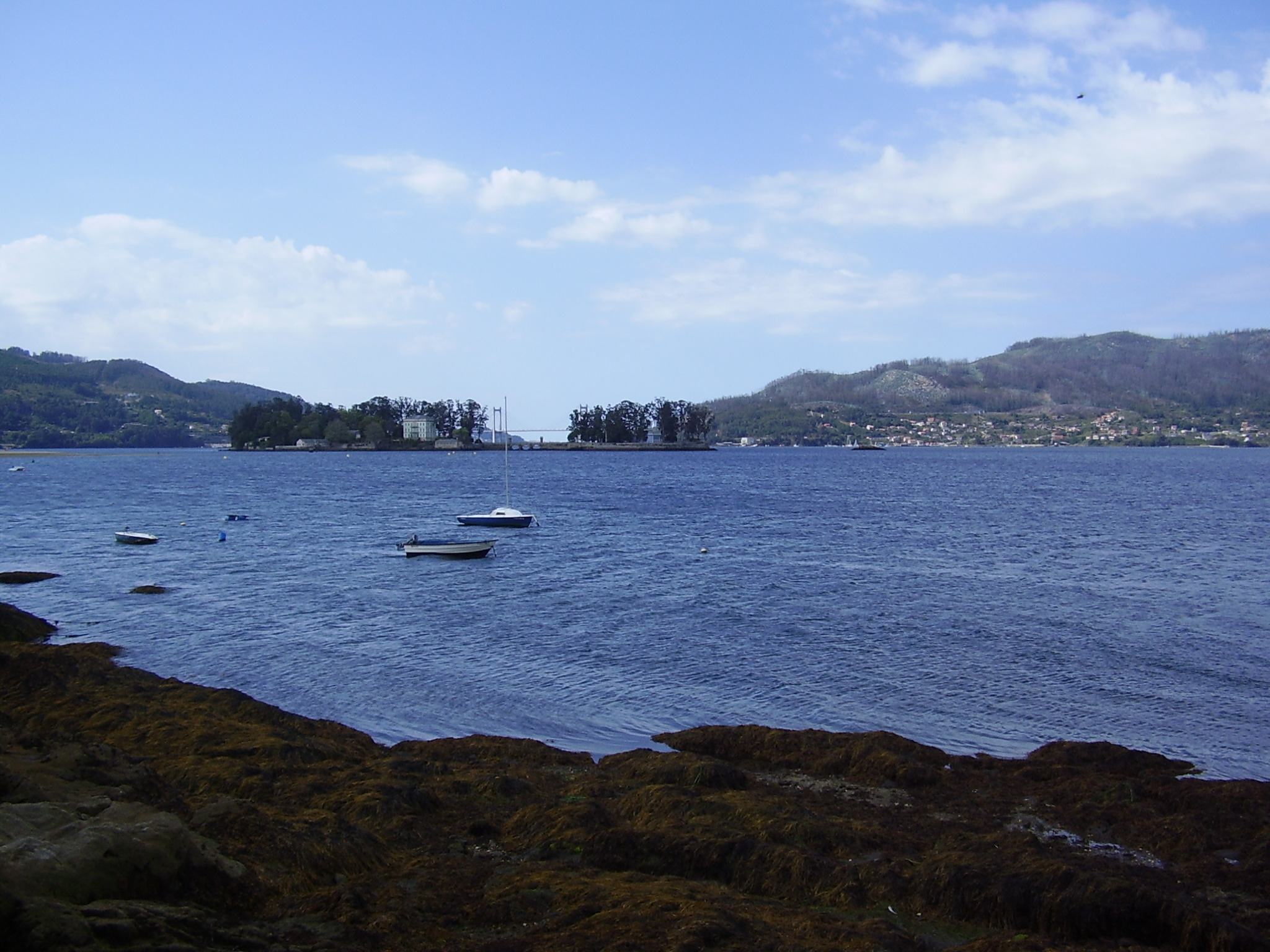
Cesantes

Cesantes is a small town in Redondela, in the Pontevedra part of the Vigo Metropolitan Area and located in Galicia, an Autonomous Community in northwestern Spain.

== Population ==
Its population in 2005 was 3,420 (1,747 men and 1,673 women) and its extension is 12 km. Most of the people work in tourism or fishing.

== Celebrities of Cesantes ==
- Iago Bouzón: Recreativo de Huelva football player
- Mendinho: Medieval poet
