= José Gallegos y Arnosa =

Spanish painter and sculptor (1857–1917)

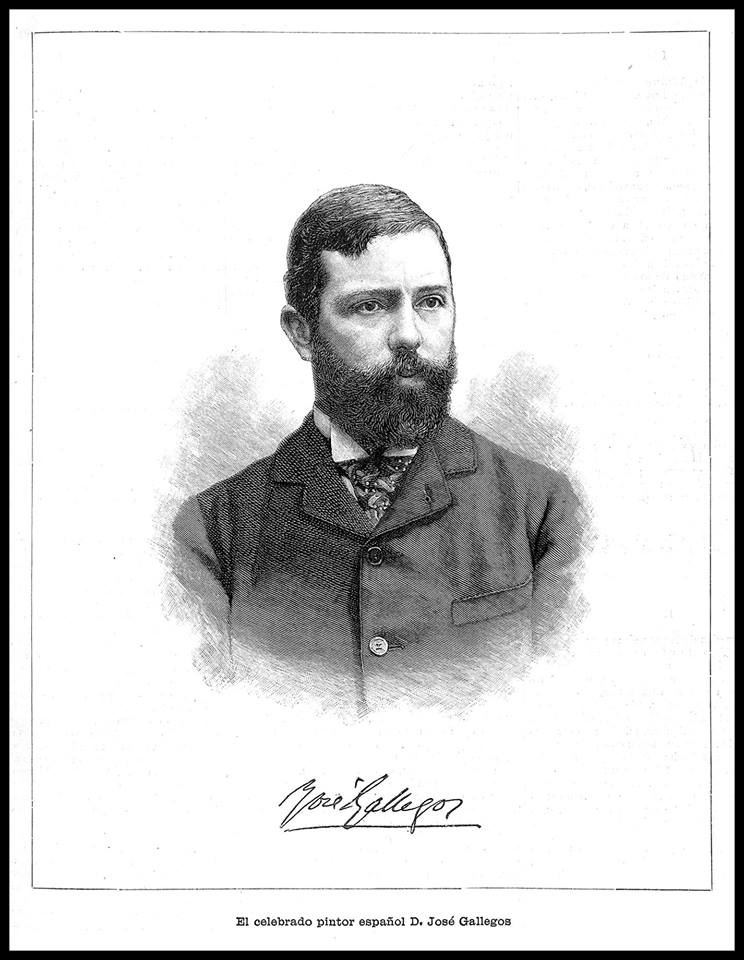
José Gallegos y Arnosa (1892)

José Gallegos y Arnosa (3 May 1857 – 20 September 1917) was a Spanish painter and sculptor; best known for his church and clerical scenes.

== Biography ==
He was born in Jerez de la Frontera. His father was employed by a winery. He was attracted to drawing and painting at an early age. He and his friend, Salvador Sánchez Barbudo, who shared his interests, frequently visited the studios of Luis Sevil (1817–1893), a local still-life painter. After learning as much as he could in Jerez, he left for Madrid in 1873 with the support of his father's employer, Guillermo Garvey (1834–?). There, he enrolled at the Real Academia de Bellas Artes de San Fernando. At his father's prompting, he initially studied architecture, but soon switched to painting and became a student of Federico de Madrazo.

Later, he developed an interest in Orientalist painting; travelling throughout North Africa. In 1878, his painting Arab Wedding was bought by the government. Urged on by Garvey, he used some of the money he received to continue his studies in Italy. By 1880, he had decided to settle in Rome. He continued to travel, however, visiting Munich, London, Paris and Berlin, as well taking an occasional trip home. His paintings sold well and he was able to enlist the Van Baerle brothers, of the Netherlands, as his agents. His works were also sold by Arthur Tooth & Sons in London.

In 1887, he married Giuseppina Trelanzi, of Milan. They had four children, including the architect, Jorge Gallegos Trelanzi. Giuseppina died in 1897. Three years later, he married Constance Harding, the daughter of an English clergyman, whom he had met while she was vacationing in Italy with her mother. She was twenty-three years younger than him and they had five children.

He was awarded a gold medal at the International Exposition of Fine Arts (1891) in Berlin. His paintings may be seen at museums in Germany, Russia, and throughout North America. One was owned by William Randolph Hearst. Few of his paintings are in Italy, as he rarely exhibited there – possibly out of concern for creating jealousy among the other Spanish-born artists, of which there were many.

He spent every summer at a rented villa in Nettuno, near Anzio, where he painted en plein aire and hunted. One day, he was out hunting wild boar, when he fell from a tree and injured his spine. As he was recovering, he died from a stroke while watching a Corpus Christi procession. His death came less than twelve hours after the death of his eldest son, Lucas. They were buried together in Nettuno.

Constance and the children were left penniless and she was forced to sell the paintings, cheaply as it turned out because her husband had not become a popular artist yet. She ran a tea room near the British Embassy. Jose had been great friends with the Italian royal family and the Queen, great friends with Constance, used to take tea in her tea room. A German agent brokered the dale of Jose's paintings but, selling the paintings after WWI meant many were paid for in what soon became worthless German marks. The Gallegos y Arnosa children moved to the US, one marrying a steel magnate and becoming the 4th-richest woman in Canada.

== Selected paintings ==
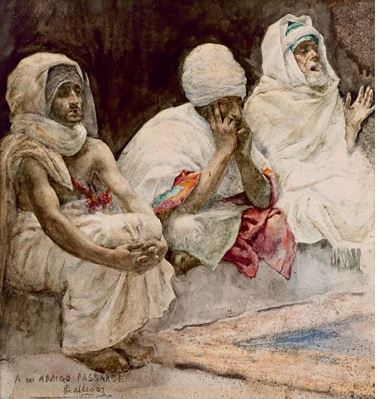
Arabs Meditating

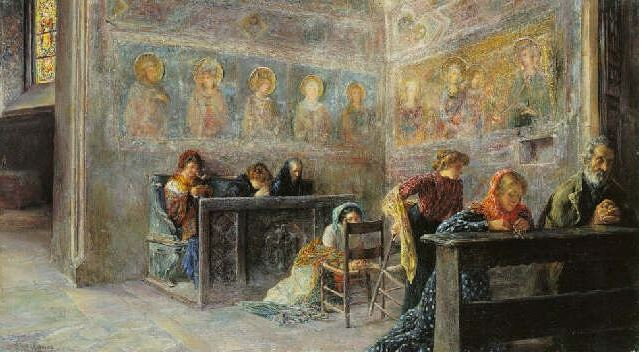
In the Church

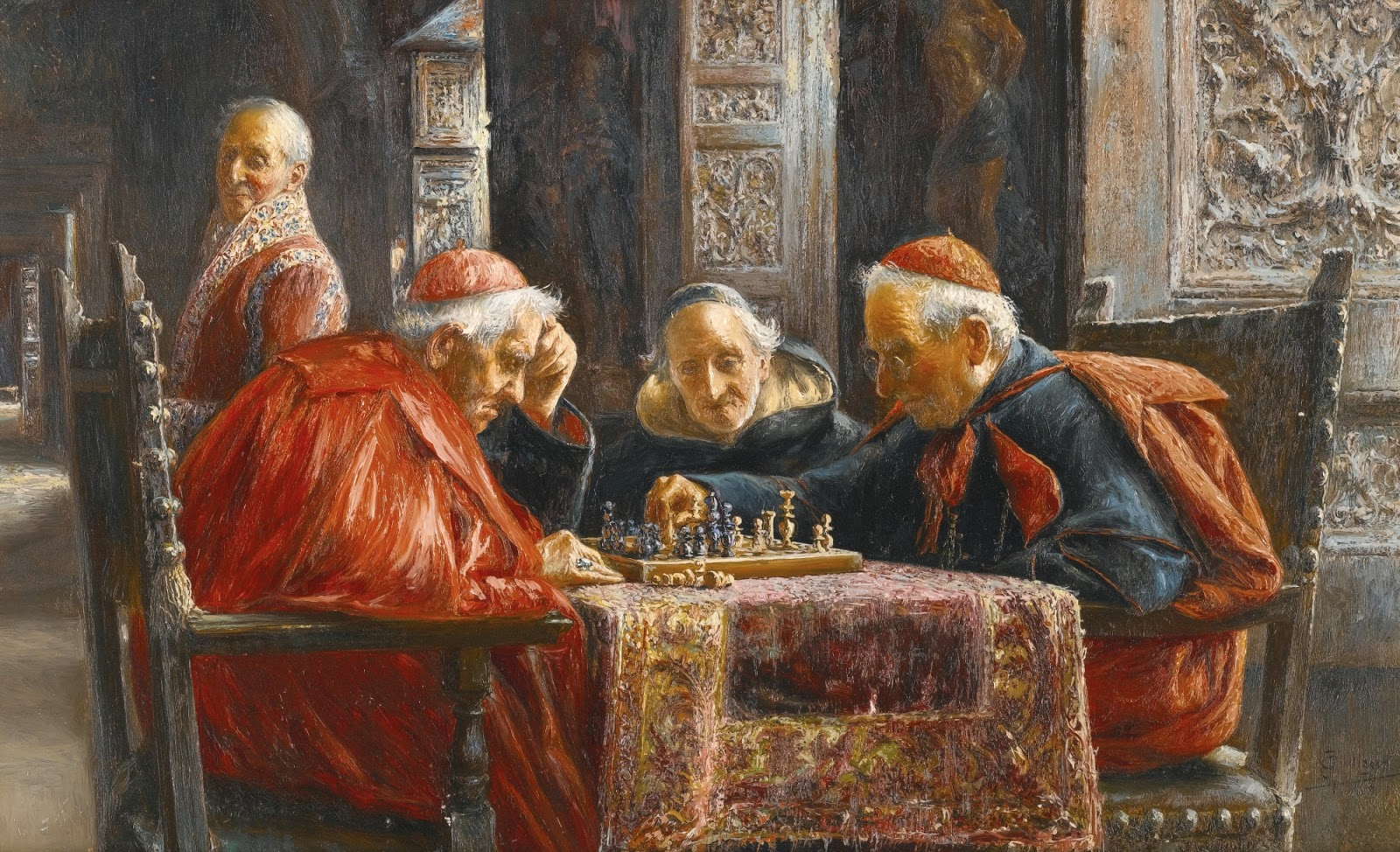
Playing Chess

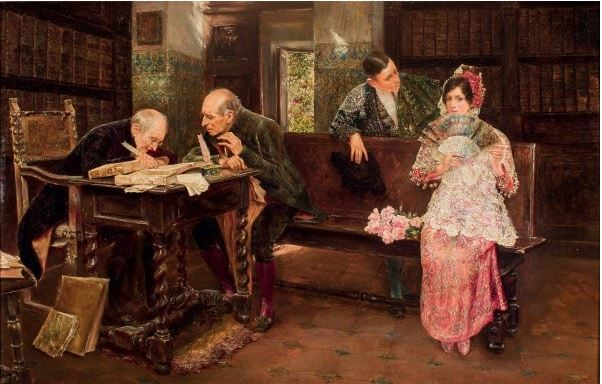
The Bride's Dowry
