= Redondela =

- Municipality
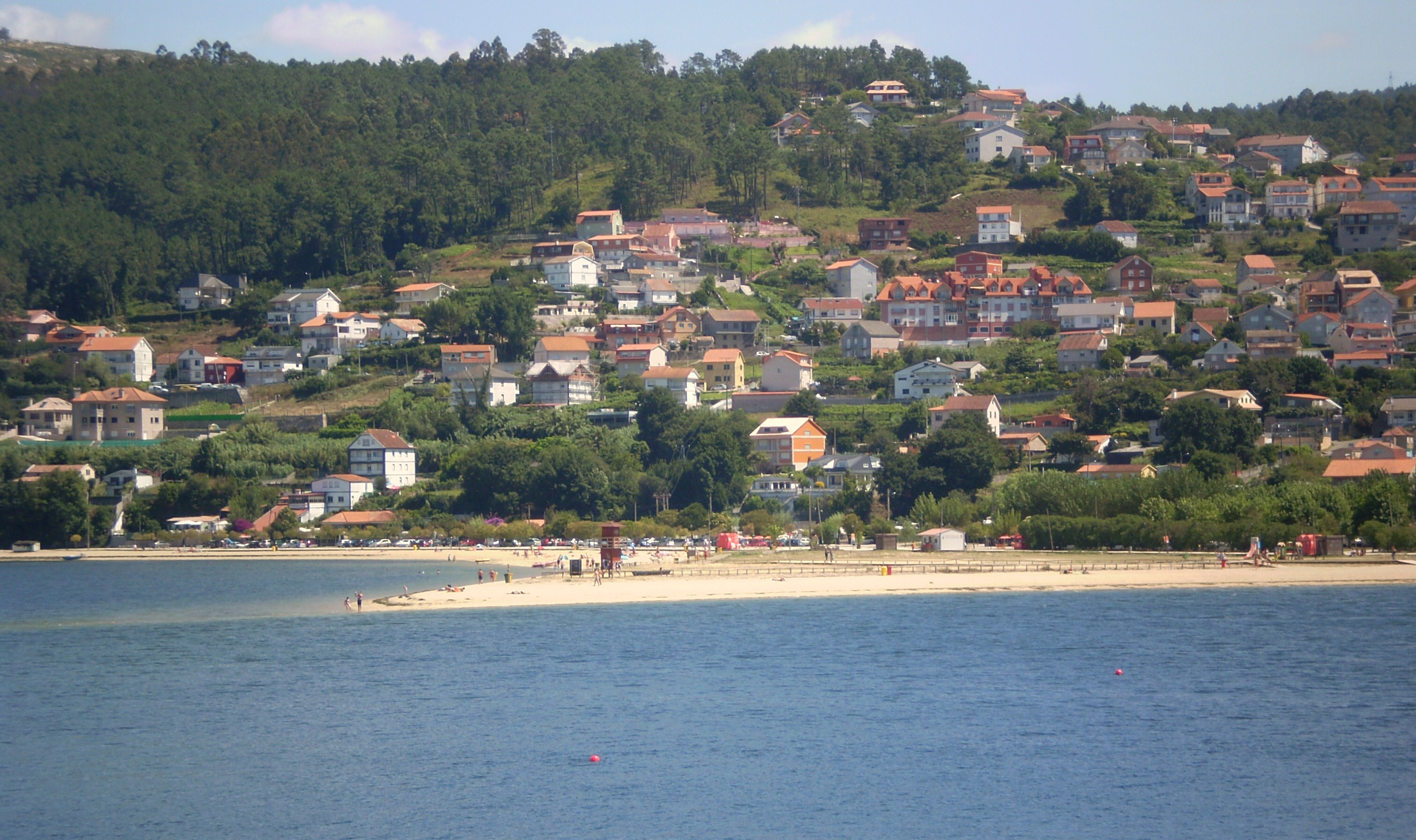

- Flag Coat of arms

- Location in Spain Redondela (Galicia) Redondela (Province of Pontevedra)
- Coordinates: 42°17′N 8°37′W
- Country: Spain
- Autonomous community: Galicia
- Province: Pontevedra
- Comarca: Vigo

Government
  - Mayor: Digna Rivas

Area
  - Total: 51.9 km^{2} (20.0 sq mi)
- Elevation: 17 m (56 ft)

Population (2025-01-01)
  - Total: 28,874
  - Density: 556/km^{2} (1,440/sq mi)
- Demonym: Redondeláns
- Postal code: 36800
- Website: Official website

Redondela is a municipality in the province of Pontevedra, in the autonomous community of Galicia, Spain. It belongs to the comarca of Vigo. The most famous icons of the village are its two major railway viaducts built in the nineteenth century. Due to these infrastructures Redondela is known under the nickname "Village of the viaducts." The town lies on the Portuguese Way, one of the Camino de Santiago pilgrimage routes.

The municipality has an area of 51.9 km2 (20.0 sq mi) and has a population of 29,192 in 2021.

== Parroquias ==
- Cabeiro
- Cedeira
- Cesantes
- Chapela
- Negros
- Quintela
- Reboreda
- Redondela
- Saxamonde
- Trasmañó
- Ventosela
- Vilar de Infesta
- O Viso

== Verne Monument ==
The Town has a large monument to Jules Verne.

== See also ==
- List of municipalities in Pontevedra
- Ignacio Ramonet
- Battle of Vigo Bay
- Mendinho
- Ernestina Otero
