= José Manuel Gallegos Rocafull =

José Manuel Gallegos Rocafull (b. Cádiz, August 21, 1895 - d. Mexico, 1963) was a Spanish priest, canon of the Cathedral of Cordoba, theologian and philosopher.

Gallegos studied at the General and Technical Institute of Seville and later at the Theological Seminary. Upon completion of basic academic training, he matriculated to the Seminary of Madrid to continue his religious training, attending the Pontifical University of Toledo where he graduated in theology in 1920. He later earned his doctorate in the Pontificia Universidad de Sevilla.

As chaplain of the Adoration of Madrid, he received a BA in philosophy and literature from the Central University. In 1921 he was appointed canon of the Cathedral of Granada, where he promoted, together with the bishopric, a significant undertaking in construction projects and equipment housing.

Residing in the House Conciliar de Madrid, he met the future cardinal, Vicente Enrique y Tarancon, a key figure in the Spanish transition to democracy.

At the outbreak of the Civil War, he resided in Madrid, having recently completed his doctorate in philosophy under the direction of José Ortega y Gasset. As a member of Catholic Action, he remained steadfastly loyal to the government of the Second Republic and quickly began a remarkable work of the legal defense against the rebels.

He attended several conferences abroad, mainly in Belgium and France in support of republican legality, although it was silence his voice through the Cardinal Primate of Spain, who requested and obtained from the Vatican to defend the express prohibition of the Republicans. In Paris he joined Editions Esprit, press organ of the French Catholic left. Highlighted in the three years of war battle that made the concept of Crusade and Holy War claimed that the insurgents to justify their actions in the Spanish war. He also criticized the killing of priests, but defended the innocence of the Popular Front and the Republican administration of those crimes, which he attributed always popular uncontrolled reactions during the first months of the war:

When seeing the violence committed against persons or property devoted to worship, they persist in attributing the Popular Front Government Persecuted deliberate policy, seems to forget that in the Basque Country, where the enthusiasm to fight the rebels is incomparable However, priests and religious respect and enjoy the most absolute freedom, and worship continues with the diligence and devotion that are there to traditional ... Diario ABC, Madrid, edition of February 5, 1937

That same year (1937) he was suspended a divinis by Bishop Adolfo Pérez Muñoz. In 1938 he went into exile in Mexico, where they pitched their lives forever. Welcomed by the authorities, he was Professor of Philosophy of the National Autonomous University and the Universidad Iberoamericana. Through the mediation of the Mexican church, the suspension was lifted a divinis, and at the same time as a teacher, was a leading chaplain of the Church of the Coronation until his death.
