= Sacred prostitution =

Sexual rite performed in the context of religious worship

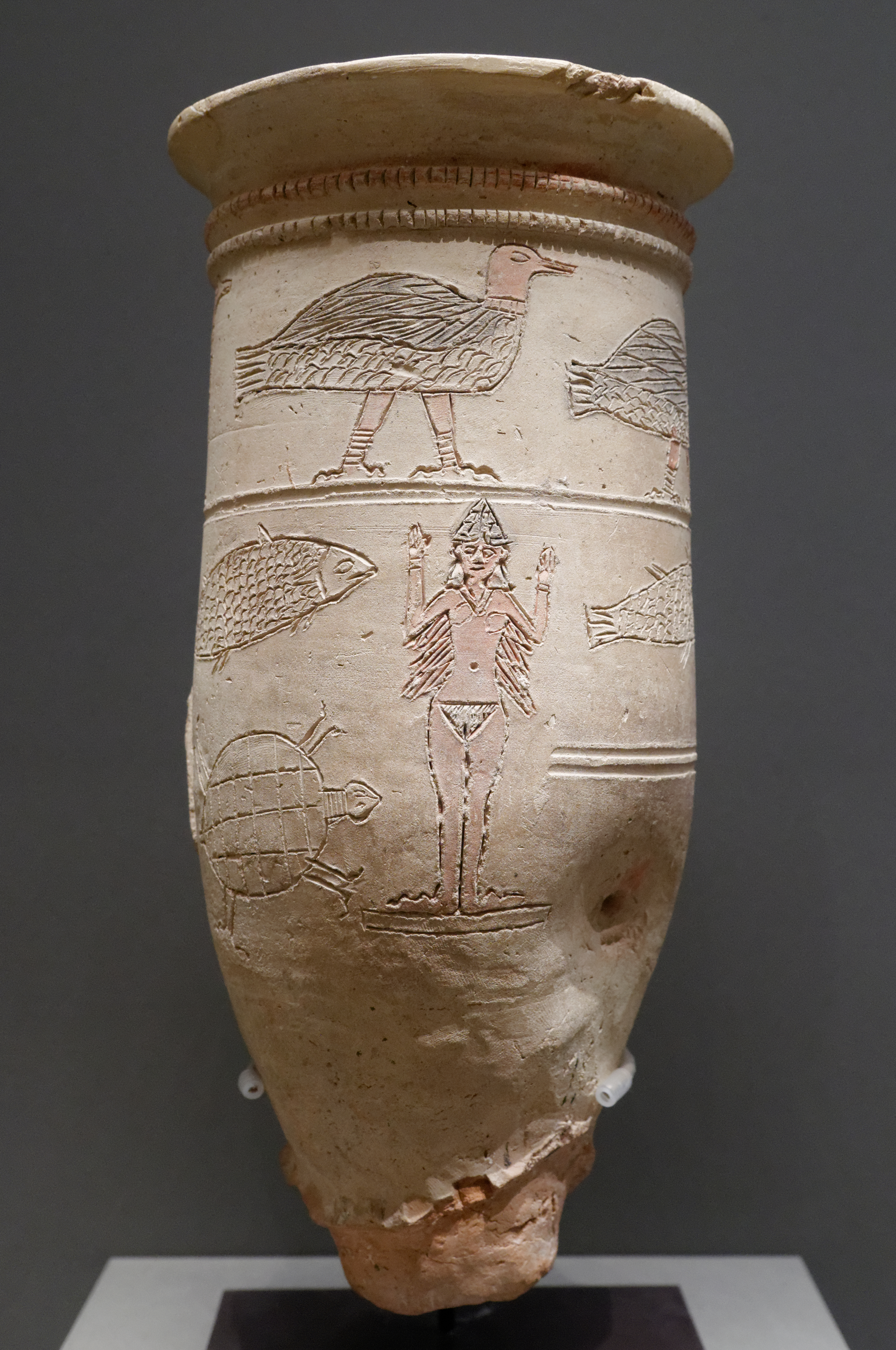
Inanna/Ishtar, Mesopotamian goddess of sex and fertility, depicted on a ceremonial vase

Sacred prostitution, temple prostitution, cult prostitution, and religious prostitution are purported rites consisting of paid intercourse performed in the context of religious worship, possibly as a form of fertility rite or divine marriage (hieros gamos). Scholars prefer the terms "sacred sex" or "sacred sexual rites" in cases where payment for services is not involved.

The historicity of literal sacred prostitution, particularly in some places and periods, is a controversial topic within the academic world. Historically mainstream historiography has considered it a probable reality, based on the abundance of ancient sources and chroniclers detailing its practices, although it has proved harder to differentiate between true prostitution and sacred sex without remuneration. Beginning in the late 20th century, a number of scholars have challenged the veracity of sacred prostitution as a concept, suggesting that the claims are based on mistranslations, misunderstandings or outright inventions of ancient authors. Authors have also interpreted evidence as secular prostitution administered in the temple under the patronage of fertility deities, not as an act of religious worship by itself.

== Definitions ==
Sacred prostitution has many different characteristics depending on the region, class and the religious ideals of the period and the place, and consequently can have many different definitions.

Historian Stephanie Budin offers one definition: "Sacred prostitution is the sale of a person’s body for sexual purposes where some portion (if not all) of the money or goods received for this transaction belongs to a deity." Budin references three types of such sacred prostitution references in Classical sources: once-in-a-lifetime and/or sale-of-virginity prostitution to honor a goddess, professional prostitutes owned by a deity's sanctuary or the deity itself, and temporary prostitution before marriage or for certain rituals.

== Ancient Near East ==
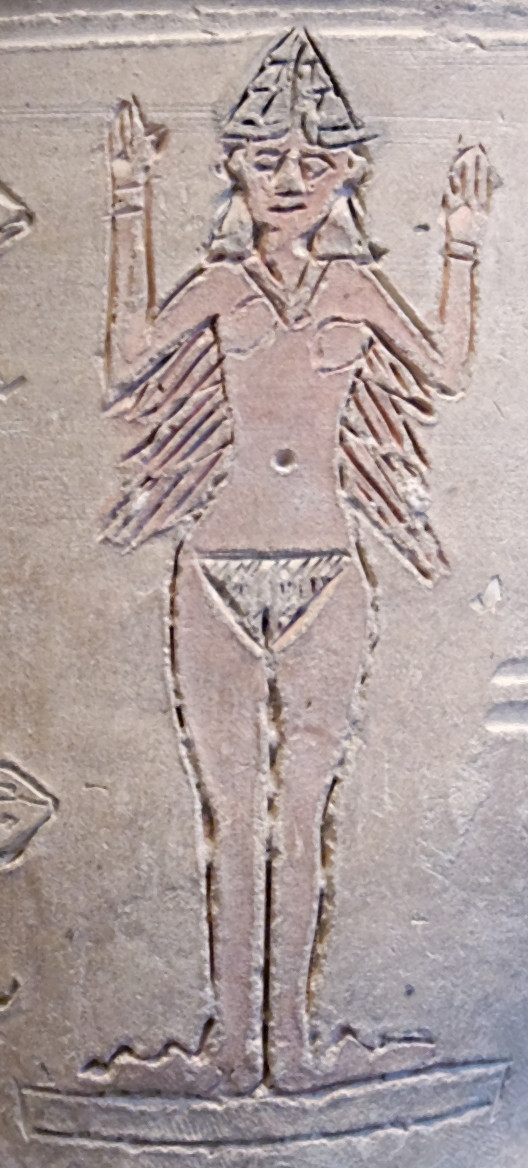
Inanna depicted wearing the ceremonial headdress of the high priestess

Ancient Near Eastern societies along the Tigris and Euphrates rivers featured many shrines and temples or houses of heaven dedicated to various deities. The 5th-century BCE historian Herodotus's account and some other testimony from the Hellenistic Period and Late Antiquity suggest that ancient societies encouraged the practice of sacred sexual rites not only in Babylonia and Cyprus, but throughout the Near East.

The work of gender researchers like Daniel Arnaud, Julia Assante and Stephanie Budin has cast the whole tradition of scholarship that defined the concept of sacred prostitution into doubt. Budin regards the concept of sacred prostitution as a myth, arguing that the practices described in the sources were misunderstandings of either non-remunerated ritual sex or non-sexual religious ceremonies, or possibly even invented as rhetorical devices.

=== Sumer ===
Through the twentieth century, scholars generally believed that a form of sacred marriage rite (hieros gamos) was staged between the kings in the ancient Near Eastern region of Sumer and the high priestesses of Inanna, the Sumerian goddess of sexual love, fertility, and warfare, later called Ishtar. The king would have sex with the priestess to represent the union of Dumuzid with Inanna. According to the noted Assyriologist Samuel Noah Kramer, the kings would further establish their legitimacy by taking part in a ritual sexual act in the temple of the fertility goddess Ishtar every year on the tenth day of the New Year festival Akitu.

However, no certain evidence has survived to prove that sexual intercourse was included, despite many popular descriptions of the habit. It is possible that these unions never occurred but were embellishments to the image of the king; hymns which praise Ancient Near Eastern kings for coupling with the goddess Ishtar often speak of them as running 320 km (200 mi), offering sacrifices, feasting with the sun-god Utu, and receiving a royal crown from An, all in a single day. Some modern historians argue in the same direction, though their posture has been disputed.

=== Babylonia ===
According to Herodotus, the rites performed at these temples included sexual intercourse, or what scholars later called sacred sexual rites:

The foulest Babylonian custom is that which compels every woman of the land to sit in the temple of Aphrodite (Ishtar) and have intercourse with some stranger at least once in her life. Many women who are rich and proud and disdain to mingle with the rest, drive to the temple in covered carriages drawn by teams, and stand there with a great retinue of attendants. But most sit down in the sacred plot of Aphrodite, with crowns of cord on their heads; there is a great multitude of women coming and going; passages marked by line run every way through the crowd, by which the men pass and make their choice. Once a woman has taken her place there, she does not go away to her home before some stranger has cast money into her lap, and had intercourse with her outside the temple; but while he casts the money, he must say, "I invite you in the name of Mylitta". It does not matter what sum the money is; the woman will never refuse, for that would be a sin, the money being by this act made sacred. So she follows the first man who casts it and rejects no one. After their intercourse, having discharged her sacred duty to the goddess, she goes away to her home; and thereafter there is no bribe however great that will get her. So then the women that are fair and tall are soon free to depart, but the uncomely have long to wait because they cannot fulfil the law; for some of them remain for three years, or four. There is a custom like this in some parts of Cyprus.

The British anthropologist James Frazer accumulated citations to prove this in a chapter of his magnum opus The Golden Bough (1890–1915), and this has served as a starting point for several generations of scholars. Frazer and Henriques distinguished two major forms of sacred sexual rites: temporary rite of unwed girls (with variants such as dowry-sexual rite, or as public defloration of a bride), and lifelong sexual rite. However, Frazer took his sources mostly from authors of Late Antiquity (i.e. 150–500 AD), not from the Classical or Hellenistic periods. This raises questions as to whether the phenomenon of temple sexual rites can be generalised to the whole of the ancient world, as earlier scholars typically did.

In Hammurabi's code of laws, the rights and good name of female sacred sexual priestesses were protected. The same legislation that protected married women from slander applied to them and their children. They could inherit property from their fathers, collect income from land worked by their brothers, and dispose of property. These rights have been described as extraordinary, taking into account the role of women at the time.

=== Terms associated with temple prostitution in Sumer and Babylonia ===
All translations are sourced from the Pennsylvania Sumerian Dictionary. Akkadian terms were used in the Akkadian Empire, Assyria, and Babylonia. The terms themselves come from lexical profession lists on tablets dating back to the Early Dynastic period.

English	Sumerian	Akkadian	Signs	Cuneiform
Abbess	nin-diĝir	ēntu	SAL.TUG_{2}.AN	𒊩𒌆𒀭
Priestess	lukur	nadītu	SAL.ME	𒊩𒈨
Nun	nugig	qadištu	NU.GIG	𒉡𒍼
Hierodule Priestess	nubar	kulmašītu	NU.BAR	𒉡𒁇
Cult Prostitute	amalu	ištaru	GA_{2}×AN.LUL	𒂼𒈜
A Class of Women	sekrum	sekretu	ZI.IG.AŠ	𒍣𒅅𒀸
Prostitute	^{geme_{2}}karkid	harīmtu	^{SAL×KUR}TE.A.KID	𒊩𒆳𒋼𒀀𒆤
Prostitute (EDIIIb)	^{geme_{2}}karkid	harīmtu	^{SAL×KUR}TE.A.AK	𒊩𒆳𒋼𒀀𒀝

Notes on the cuneiform: by convention Akkadian is italicised, spoken Sumerian is lowercase and cuneiform sign transliteration is uppercase. In addition, a determinative sign is written as a superscript. Determinatives are only written and never spoken. In spoken Sumerian homophones are distinguished by a numerical subscript.

=== Hittites ===
The Hittites practiced sacred prostitution as part of a cult of deities, including the worship of a mated pair of deities, a bull god and a lion goddess, while in later days it was the mother-goddess who became prominent, representing fertility, and (in Phoenicia) the goddess who presided over human birth.

=== Phoenicia ===
It has been argued that sacred prostitution, worked by both males and females, was a custom of ancient Phoenicians. It would be dedicated to the deities Astarte and Adonis, and sometimes performed as a festival or social rite in the cities of Byblos, Afqa and Baalbek (later named Heliopolis) as well as the nearby Syrian city of Palmyra.

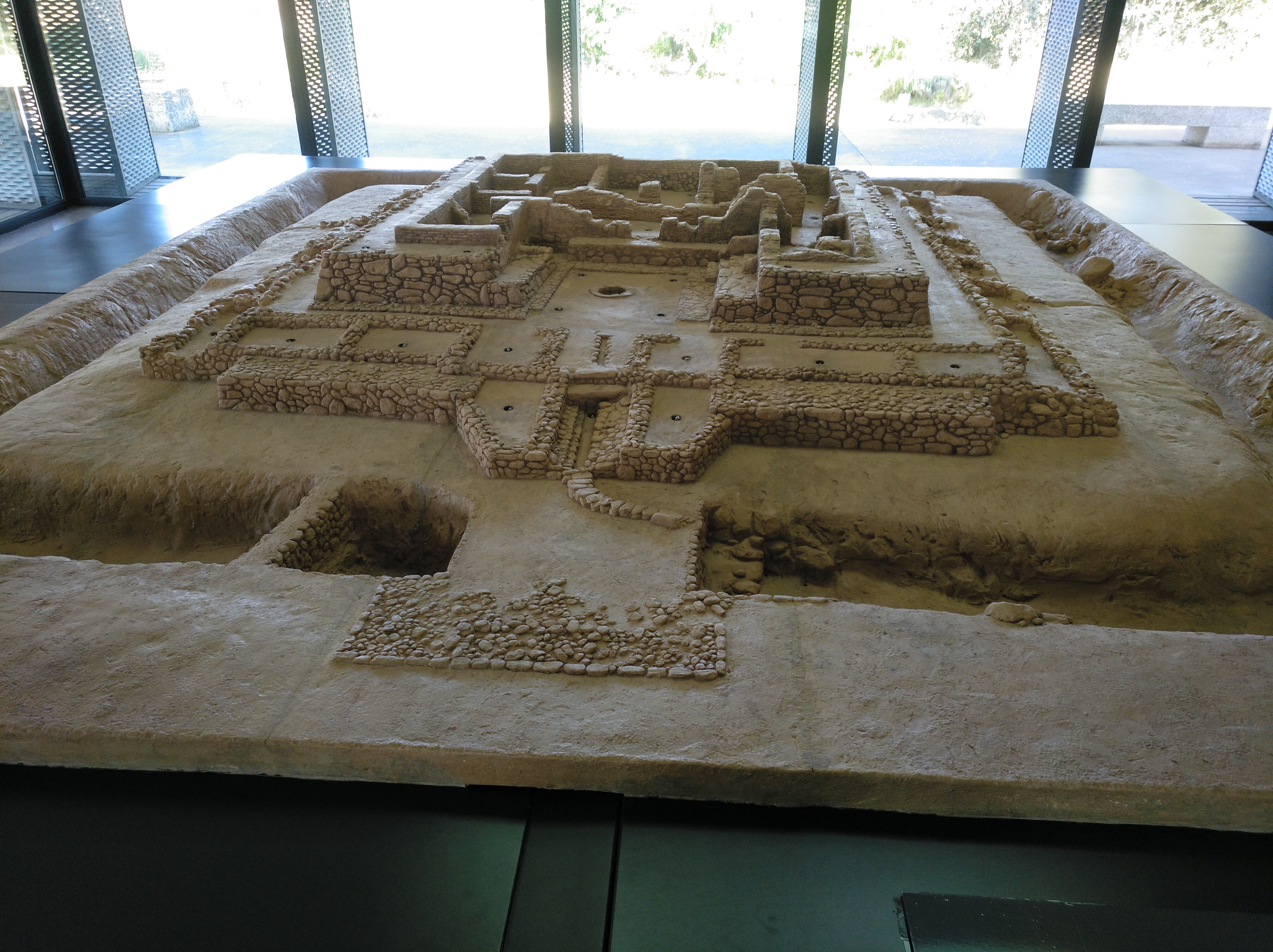
Complex of Cancho Roano, Spain, a proposed place of temple prostitution

At the Etruscan site of Pyrgi, a center of worship of the eastern goddess Astarte, archaeologists identified a temple consecrated to her and built with at least 17 small rooms that may have served as quarters for temple prostitutes. Similarly, a temple dedicated to her equated goddess Atargatis in Dura-Europos, was found with nearly a dozen small rooms with low benches, which might have used either for sacred meals or sacred services of women jailed in the temple for adultery. Pyrgi's sacred prostitutes were famous enough to be apparently mentioned in a lost fragment of Lucilius's works.

In northern Africa, the area of influence of the Phoenician colony of Carthage, this service was associated to the city of Sicca, a nearby city that received the name of Sicca Veneria for its temple of Astarte or Tanit (called Venus by Roman authors). Valerius Maximus describes how their women gained gifts by engaging in prostitution with visitors.

Phoenicio-Punic settlements in Hispania, like Cancho Roano, Gadir, Castulo and La Quéjola, have suggested this practice through their archaeology and iconography. In particular, Cancho Roano features a sanctuary built with multiple cells or rooms, which has been identified as a possible place of sacred prostitution in honor to Astarte. A similar institution might have been found in Gadir. Its posterior, renowned erotic dancers called puellae gaditanae in Roman sources (or cinaedi in the case of male dancers) might have been desecrated heirs of this practice, considering the role occupied by sex and dance on Phoenician culture.

Cyprus was another center of the Astarte cult. Her main temples were in Paphos, Amathus and Kition. The epigraphy of the Kition temple describes personal economic activity on the temple, as sacred prostitution would have been taxed as any other occupation, and names possible practitioners as grm (male) and lmt (female).

=== Ancient Israel ===
The Hebrew Bible uses two different words for prostitute, zonah (Hebrew: זונה, romanized: zonā) and qedesha (קדשה qəḏēšā). Zonah meant an ordinary prostitute or "loose woman'". Qedeshah literally means "set apart" (in feminine form), from the triliteral קדש Q-D-Š, meaning "holy, consecrated, set apart". Zonah and qedeshah are not interchangeable terms: the former occurs 93 times in the Bible, whereas the latter is only used in five places, conveying different connotations.

This double meaning has led to the belief that qedeshot (the plural of qedesha) were not ordinary prostitutes, but sacred ones who worked out of fertility temples. However, the lack of solid evidence has indicated that the word might refer to prostitutes who offered their services in the vicinity of temples, where they could attract a larger number of clients. The term might have originated as consecrated maidens employed in Canaanite and Phoenician temples, which became synonymous with harlotry for Biblical writers.

In any case, the translation of sacred prostitute has continued, however, because it explains how the word can mean such disparate concepts as "sacred" and "prostitute". As put by DeGrado, "neither the interpretation of the קדשה as a 'priestess-not-prostitute' (according to Westenholz) nor as a 'prostitute-not-priestess' (according to Gruber) adequately represents the semantic range of Hebrew word in biblical and post-biblical Hebrew."

Male prostitutes were called qadesh. The Hebrew word kelev "dog" may also signify a male dancer or prostitute.

The Mosaic Law as outlined in the Book of Deuteronomy was not universally observed in Israelite culture under the Davidic line in the United Kingdom of Israel, as recorded in the Books of Kings. According to 2 Kings 22, the Kingdom of Judah had lost "the Book of the Law". During the reign of King Josiah, Hilkiah, the High Priest of Israel, discovered it in "the House of the Lord" and realized that the people have disobeyed, particularly regarding prostitution.

== Ancient Greece and Hellenistic world ==
=== Ancient Greece ===
The Greek term hierodoulos or hierodule has sometimes been taken to mean sacred holy woman, but it is more likely to refer to a former slave freed from slavery in order to be dedicated to a god.

There were different levels of prostitutes within Ancient Greek society, but two categories are specifically related to sacred or temple prostitution. The first category are hetaires, also known as courtesans, typically more educated women that served within temples. The second category are known as hierodoules, slave women or female priests who worked within temples and served the sexual requests of visitors to the temple.

While there may not be a direct connection between temples and prostitution, many prostitutes and courtesans worshipped Aphrodite, the goddess of love. Prostitutes would use their earnings to pay for dedications and ritualistic celebrations in honour of Aphrodite. Some prostitutes also viewed the action of sexual service and sexual pleasure as an act of devotion to the goddess of love, worshipping Aphrodite through an act rather than a physical dedication.

In the temple of Apollo at Bulla Regia, a woman was found buried with an inscription reading: "Adulteress. Prostitute. Seize [me], because I fled from Bulla Regia." It has been speculated she might have been a woman forced into sacred prostitution as a punishment for adultery.

==== Temple(s) of Aphrodite ====
The act of sacred prostitution within the Temple of Aphrodite in the city of Corinth was well-known and well-spread. Greek writer-philosopher Strabo comments, "the Temple of Aphrodite was so rich that it owned a thousand temple-slaves, courtesans, whom both men and women had dedicated to the goddess". Within the same work, Strabo compares Corinth to the city of Comana, confirming the belief that temple prostitution was a notable characteristic of Corinth.

Prostitutes performed sacred functions within the temple of Aphrodite. They would often burn incense in honor of Aphrodite. Chameleon of Heracleia recorded in his book, On Pindar, that whenever the city of Corinth prayed to Aphrodite in manners of great importance, many prostitutes were invited to participate in the prayers and petitions.

The girls involved in temple prostitution were typically slaves owned by the temple. However, some of the girls were gifts to the temple from other members of society in return for success in particular endeavors. One example that shows the gifting of girls to the temple is the poem of Athenaeus, which explores the athlete Xenophon’s actions of gifting a group of courtesans to Aphrodite as a thanks-offering for his victory in a competition.

Specifically in 464 BC, Xenophon was victorious in the Olympic Games and donated 100 slaves to Aphrodite’s temple. Pindar, a famous Greek poet, was commissioned to write a poem that was to be performed at Xenophon’s victory celebration in Corinth. The poet acknowledged that the slaves would serve Aphrodite as sacred prostitutes within her temple at Corinth.

Another temple of Aphrodite was named Aphrodite Melainis, located near the city gates in an area known as “Craneion”. It is the resting place of Lais, who was a famous prostitute in Greek history. This suggests that there was a connection with ritual prostitution within temples of Aphrodite.

There is a report that was found of an epigram of Simonides commemorating the prayer of the prostitutes of Corinth on behalf of the salvation of the Greeks from the invading Achaemenid Empire in the Greco-Persian Wars of the early fifth century BCE. Both temple prostitutes and priestesses prayed to Aphrodite for help, and were honoured for their potent prayers, which Greek citizens believed contributed to the repelling of the Persians.

Athenaeus also alludes to the idea that many of Aphrodite’s temples and sanctuaries were occupied by temple prostitutes. These prostitutes were known to practise sexual rituals in different cities which included Corinth, Magnesia, and Samos.

==== Signs of sacred prostitution within Minoan Crete ====
Some evidence of sacred prostitution was evident in Minoan Crete. The building in question is known as the "East Building", but was also referred to as "the House of the Ladies" by the excavator of the building. Some believe that the architecture of this building seemed to reflect the grooming needs of women, but could also have been a brothel for high status individuals.

The structure of the interior of the building seemed to suggest that the building was used for prostitution. Large clay vats typically used for bathing were found within the building, along with successive doors within the corridors. The successive doors suggested privacy, and within the time period, was associated with two functions: storage of valuable goods and protection of the private moments of its residents. Because the ground floors were found practically empty, the possibility that the building was used for prostitution increases.

There were also religious embellishments found within the "East Building", such as vases and other vessels that seemed to be connected to religious rituals. The vessels were covered in motifs related to sacrilegious rituals, such as the sacral knot and the image of birds flying freely. The functions of the vessels would have been offering food or liquid in relation to the rituals. Combining these two factors, it is a possibility that sacred prostitution existed within this building.

=== Hellenistic world ===
In the Greek-influenced and colonised world, "sacred prostitution" was known in Cyprus (Greek-settled since 1100 BC), Sicily (Hellenised since 750 BC), in the Kingdom of Pontus (8th century BC) and in Cappadocia (c. 330 BC hellenised). 2 Maccabees (2 Maccabees 6:4–5) describes sacred prostitution in the Second Temple under the reign of the Hellenistic ruler Antiochus IV Epiphanes.

==== Cyprus ====
A passage in Herodotus explains a Babylonian custom where before marriage, girls had to offer themselves for sex, presumably within a temple, as required by rites of a goddess equivalent to Aphrodite in their culture. Herodotus records that a similar practice or custom took place within Cyprus, with girls offering themselves up for sex as required by the rites of Aphrodite. Ennius and Ovid corroborate each other on the idea that Aphrodite established the act of prostitution within the city of Cyprus.

A temple of Kition also shows evidence of sacred prostitution. On a marble plaque, it lists sacred prostitutes among other professions (bakers, scribes, barbers) that were part of ritual personnel at some Cypriot temples.

==== Temple of Aphaca ====
The temple of Aphaca may be another source of evidence for temple prostitution. The process is similar to regular prostitution, where male customers paid two or three obol in the form of or in addition to dedications to Aphrodite in exchange for sex with a temple prostitute. In the temple of Aphaca specifically, the men would dedicate their payment to "Cyprian Aphrodite" before engaging in sex with a temple prostitute.

== Ancient Rome and late antiquity ==
=== Late antiquity ===
The Roman emperor Constantine closed down a number of temples to Venus or similar deities in the 4th century AD, as the Christian church historian Eusebius proudly noted. Eusebius also writes that the Phoenician cities of Aphaca and Heliopolis (Baalbek) continued to practice temple prostitution until the emperor Constantine put an end to the rite in the 4th century AD.

== Asia ==
=== India ===
People in some Indian states practice hierodulic prostitution, with similar customary forms such as basavi, and involves dedicating pre-pubescent and young adolescent girls from villages in a ritual marriage to a Hindu deity or a Hindu temple, who then work in the temple and function as spiritual guides, dancers, and prostitutes servicing male devotees in the temple. The Devadasis were originally seen as intercessors who allowed upper-caste men to have contact with the gods, though they did develop sexual relations with other men. Before Muslim rule in the 14th century, they could live an existence apart from the men, with inheritance rights, wealth and influence, as well as living outside of the dangers of marriage.

The system was criticised by British colonial government while defended by Brahmins, leading to a decline in support for the system and the devadasis soon turned to prostitution. Many scholars have stated that the Hindu scriptures do not mention the system. Human Rights Watch also reports claims that devadasis are forced into this service and, at least in some cases, to practise prostitution for upper-caste members. Various state governments in India enacted laws to ban this practice both prior to India's independence and more recently. They include Bombay Devdasi Act, 1934, Devdasi (Prevention of dedication) Madras Act, 1947, Karnataka Devdasi (Prohibition of dedication) Act, 1982, and Andhra Pradesh Devdasi (Prohibition of dedication) Act, 1988. However, the tradition continues in certain regions of India, particularly the states of Karnataka and Andhra Pradesh.

=== Japan ===
During the Kamakura period, many shrines and temples, which provided for miko, fell into bankruptcy. Some miko started travelling in search of livelihood and came to be known as aruki miko. While aruki miko primarily provided religious services, they were also widely associated with prostitution. However, no religious reasons for miko prostitution are known, and hence the act might be unrelated to sacred prostitution.

=== Nepal ===
The Deukis are temple prostitutes in Nepal. The practice is banned but still exists. Wealthier families from the Kanari, Thakuri and Bista buy girls from poorer families to be dedicated to a temple; they are not allowed to marry.

== Mesoamerica and South America ==
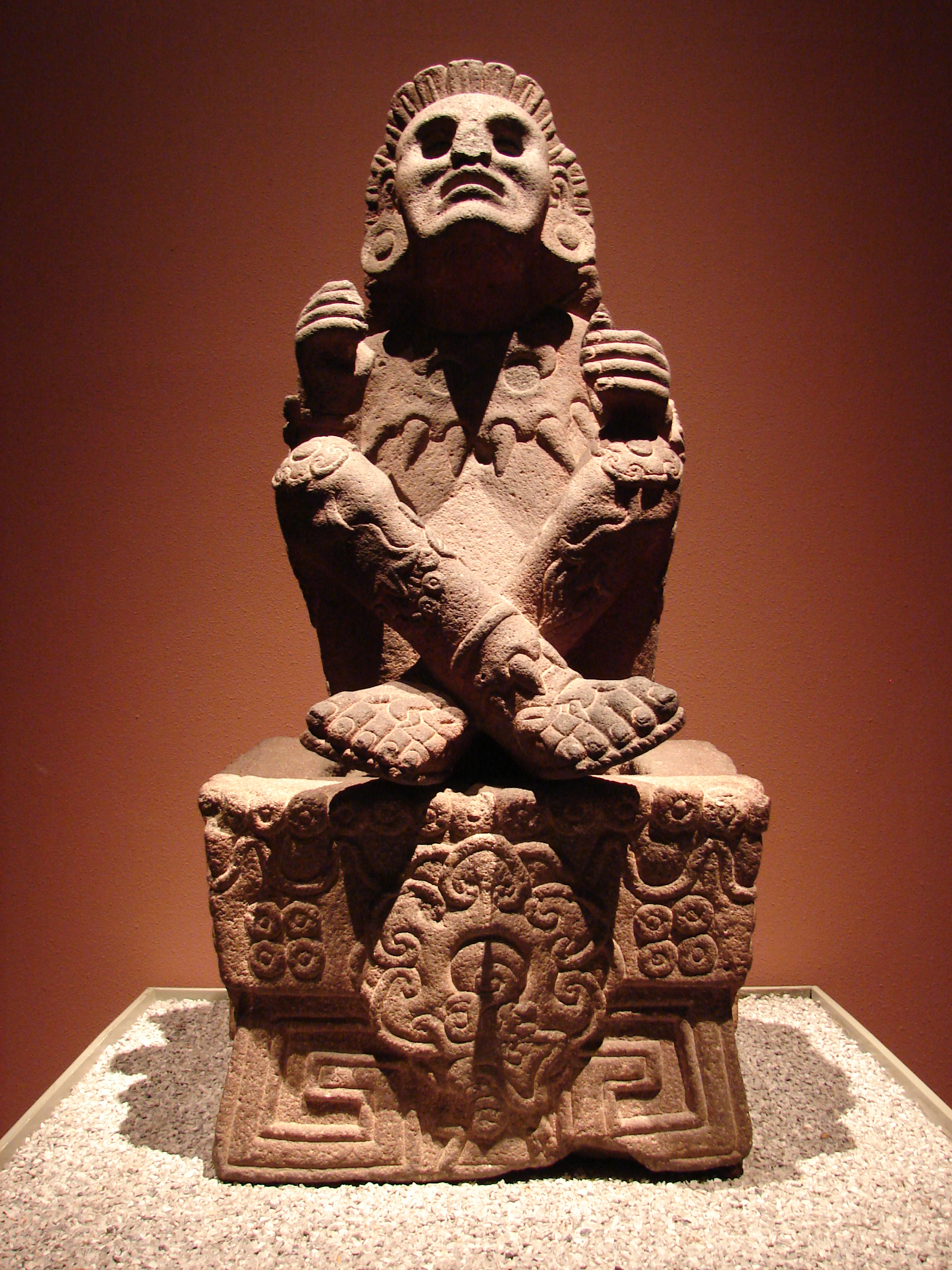
Statue of Xochipili, Aztec god of art, games, dance, flowers, and song. Patron of homosexuals and homosexual prostitutes

=== Maya ===
The Maya maintained several phallic religious cults, possibly involving homosexual temple prostitution.

=== Mexica ===
The Franciscan Spanish Friar Bernardino de Sahagún wrote that the Mexica performed sexual acts as part of religious practice. This may be evidence for the existence of sacred prostitution in Mesoamerica, or it may be confusion or accusational polemic. He also speaks of kind of prostitutes named ahuianime ("pleasure girls"), whom he described as "an evil woman who finds pleasure in her body... [A] dissolute woman of debauched life."

The Aztec god Xōchipilli (taken from both Toltec and Maya cultures) was patron of both homosexuals and homosexual prostitutes. Xochiquetzal was worshiped as a goddess of sexual power, and as patroness of prostitutes and artisans involved in the manufacture of luxury items.

=== Inca ===
The Inca sometimes dedicated young boys as temple prostitutes. The boys were dressed in girl's clothing, and chiefs and head men would have ritual sexual intercourse with them during religious ceremonies and on holy days.

== Recent Western occurrences ==
In the 1970s and early 1980s, some religious cults practised sacred prostitution as an instrument to recruit new converts. Among them was the cult Children of God, also known as The Family, who called this practice "Flirty Fishing". They later abolished the practice due to the growing AIDS epidemic.

In Ventura County, California, Wilbur and Mary Ellen Tracy established their own temple, the Church Of The Most High Goddess, in the wake of what they described as a divine revelation. Sexual acts played a fundamental role in the church's sacred rites, which were performed by Mary Ellen Tracy herself in her assumed role of High Priestess. Local newspaper articles about the Neopagan church quickly got the attention of local law enforcement officials, and in April 1989, the Tracys' house was searched and the couple arrested on charges of pimping, pandering and prostitution. They were subsequently convicted in a trial in state court and sentenced to jail terms: Wilbur Tracy for 180 days plus a $1,000.00 fine; Mary Ellen Tracy for 90 days plus mandatory screening for STDs.

Some modern sacred prostitutes act as sexual surrogates as a form of therapy. In places where prostitution is illegal, sacred prostitutes may be paid as therapists, escorts, or performers.

== Modern views ==
According to Avaren Ipsen, from University of California, Berkeley's Commission on the Status of Women, the myth of sacred prostitution works as "an enormous source of self-esteem and as a model of sex positivity" to many sex workers. She compared this situation to the figure of Mary Magdalene, whose status as a prostitute, though short-lived according to Christian texts and disputed among academics, has been celebrated by sex working collectives (among them Sex Workers Outreach Project USA) in an effort to de-stigmatize their job. Ipsen speculated that academic currents trying to deny sacred prostitution are ideologically motivated, attributing them to the "desires of feminists, including myself, to be 'decent.'"

In her book The Sacred Prostitute: Eternal Aspect of the Feminine, psychoanalyst Nancy Qualls-Corbett praised sacred prostitution as an expression of female sexuality and a bridge between the latter and the divine, as well as a rupture from mundane sexual degradation. "[The sacred prostitute] did not make love in order to obtain admiration or devotion from the man who came to her... She did not require a man to give her a sense of her own identity; rather this was rooted in her own womanliness." Qualls also equated censuring sacred prostitution to demonize female sexuality and vitality. "In her temple, men and women came to find life and all that it had to offer in sensual pleasure and delight. But with the change in cultural values and the institutionalization of monotheism and patriarchy, the individual came to the House of God to prepare for death."

This opinion is shared by several schools of modern Paganism, among them Wicca, for whom sacred prostitution, independently from its historical backing, embodies the sacralization of sex and a celebration of the communion between female and male sexuality. This practice is associated to spiritual healing and sex magic. Within secular thinking, philosopher Antonio Escohotado is a popular adept of this current, favoring particularly the role of ancient sacred prostitutes and priestesses of Ishtar. In his seminal work Rameras y esposas, he extols them and their cult as symbols of female empowerment and sexual freedom.

== See also ==
- Deuki
- Devadasi
- Hetaera
- Shamhat
- Sex worker
- Sex magic
- Primitive promiscuity
- Hijra (South Asia)
- Sexuality in ancient Rome
- List of fertility deities
- List of love and lust deities
- Padre Putas

== Bibliography ==
- Arnaud, Daniel (1973). "La prostitution sacrée en Mésopotamie, un mythe historiographique?". Revue de l'Histoire des Religions (183): 111–115.
- Assante, Julia (2003). "From Whores to Hierodules: the Historiographic Invention of Mesopotamian Female Sex Professionals". In Donohue, A. A.; Fullerton, Mark D. (eds.). Ancient Art and its Historiography. Cambridge University Press. ISBN 9780521815673.
- Baugh, S. M. (September 1999). "Cult Prostitution In New Testament Ephesus: A Reappraisal". Journal of the Evangelical Theological Society. 42 (3): 443–460. Archived from the original on 22 April 2021.
- Bernardino de Sahagún (1982). Florentine Codex: General History of the Things of New Spain : Introductions and Indices. University of Utah Press. ISBN 9780874801651.
- Bird, Phyllis A. (2020). Harlot or Holy Woman?: A Study of Hebrew Qedešah. Penn State Press. ISBN 978-1-64602-020-1.
- Budin, Stephanie Lynn (2008). The Myth of Sacred Prostitution in Antiquity. Cambridge University Press. ISBN 9780521880909.
- Clendinnen, Inga (1991). Aztecs: An Interpretation. Cambridge and New York: Cambridge University Press. ISBN 0-521-40093-7. OCLC 22451031.
- Cooper, Jerrold S. (1971). "Prostitution" (PDF). Reallexikon der Assyriologie. de Gruyter. ISBN 9783110195453. Archived (PDF) from the original on 19 June 2020.
- Day, John (2004). "Does the Old Testament Refer to Sacred Prostitution and Did it Actually Exist in Ancient Israel?". In McCarthy, Carmel; Healey, John F. (eds.). Biblical & Near Eastern Essays. A&C Black. pp. 2–21. ISBN 9780826466907.
- Debord, Pierre (1982). Aspects Sociaux et économiques de la Vie Religieuse Dans L'Anatolie Gréco-Romaine (in French). BRILL. ISBN 9789004064690. Archived from the original on 16 January 2023.
- DeGrado, Jessie (12 January 2018). "The qdesha in Hosea 4:14: Putting the (Myth of the) Sacred Prostitute to Bed". Vetus Testamentum. 68 (1): 8–40. doi:10.1163/15685330-12341300.
- Dunbar, Julie C. (2015). Women, Music, Culture: An Introduction. Routledge. ISBN 9781351857451. Archived from the original on 16 January 2023.
- Escohotado, Antonio (2018). Rameras y Esposas: Cuatro Mitos Sobre Sexo y Deber (in Spanish). Independently Published. ISBN 9781729289563.
- Estrada, Gabriel S. (2003). "An Aztec Two-Spirit Cosmology: Re-Sounding Nahuatl Masculinities, Elders, Femininities, and Youth". Frontiers: A Journal of Women Studies. 24 (2/3): 10–14. doi:10.1353/fro.2004.0008. ISSN 0160-9009. JSTOR 3347344. S2CID 144868230.
- Flornoy, Bertrand (1958). The World of the Inca. Translated by Winifred Bradford. Doubleday.
- Frazer, James George (1914). The Golden Bough: A Study in Magic and Religion (3rd ed.). Published in 12 volumes
  - Frazer, James George (1922). The Golden Bough: A Study in Magic and Religion (abridged ed.).
- Greenberg, David F. (1988). The Construction of Homosexuality. University of Chicago Press. ISBN 9780226306278.
- Grossman, Maxine; et al. (2011). The Oxford Dictionary of the Jewish Religion. Oxford University Press. ISBN 9780199730049. Archived from the original on 16 January 2023.
- Gruber, Mayer (1986). "Hebrew Qedesha and her Canaanite and Akkadian Cognates". Ugarit-Forschungen (18): 133–148.
- Guerra, Francisco (1971). The Pre-Columbian Mind: A Study Into the Aberrant Nature of Sexual Drives, Drugs Affecting Behaviour and the Attitude Towards Life and Death, with a Survey of Psychotherapy in Pre-Columbian America. Seminar Press Limited. ISBN 9780128410509.
- Herodotus (1920) [c.440 BC]. The Histories of Herodotus. Translated by A. D. Godley. Harvard University Press.
- Henriques, Fernando (1961). Prostitution and society: a survey. MacGibbon & Kee.
- Holland, Eileen (2008). The Wicca Handbook. Weiser Books. ISBN 9781609254520. "isbn:9781609254520."
- Hunter, Jennifer Tibe (2006). "Sacred Prostitution, Contemporary". In Ditmore, Melissa Hope (ed.). Encyclopedia of Prostitution and Sex Work, Volume 2. Greenwood Press. ISBN 0-313-32970-2. Archived from the original on 16 January 2023.
- Ipsen, Avaren (2014). Sex Working and the Bible. Routledge. ISBN 9781317490661. Archived from the original on 16 January 2023.
- Kamionkowski, S. Tamar (2003). Gender Reversal and Cosmic Chaos: A Study in the Book of Ezekiel. Bloomsbury Publishing. ISBN 9780567137876. Archived from the original on 16 January 2023.
- Keen, Benjamin (1990). The Aztec Image in Western Thought. Rutgers University Press. ISBN 9780813515724. Archived from the original on 16 January 2023.
- Kramer, Samuel Noah (1969). The sacred marriage rite; aspects of faith, myth, and ritual in ancient Sumer. Indiana University Press. ISBN 978-0253350350.
- Kuly, Lisa (2003). "Locating Transcendence in Japanese Minzoku Geinô: Yamabushi and Miko Kagura". Ethnologies. 25 (1): 191–208. doi:10.7202/007130ar. ISSN 1481-5974.
- Lipiński, Edward (April 2013). "Cult Prostitution and Passage Rites in the Biblical World" (PDF). The Biblical Annals. 60 (1): 9–27. Archived from the original (PDF) on 17 July 2019.
- Miller, Mary; Taube, Karl (1993). The Gods and Symbols of Ancient Mexico and the Maya: An Illustrated Dictionary of Mesoamerican Religion. London: Thames & Hudson. ISBN 0-500-05068-6. OCLC 27667317.
- Pike, Sarah M. (2004). New Age and Neopagan Religions in America. Columbia University Press. ISBN 9780231124034.
- Qualls-Corbett, Nancy (1988). The Sacred Prostitute: Eternal Aspect of the Feminine. Inner City Books. ISBN 9780919123311.
- Ruspini, Elisabetta; Bonifacio, Glenda Tibe, eds. (2018). Women and Religion: Contemporary and Future Challenges in the Global Era. Policy Press. ISBN 9781447336372. Archived from the original on 16 January 2023.
- Singh, Nagendra Kr (1997). Divine Prostitution. APH Publishing. ISBN 9788170248217. Archived from the original on 16 January 2023.
- Smith, Michael E. (2003). The Aztecs (2nd ed.). Malden, MA: Blackwell Publishing. ISBN 0-631-23015-7. OCLC 48579073.
- Stol, Marten (2016). "Temple Prostitution". Women in the Ancient Near East. Walter de Gruyter GmbH & Co KG. ISBN 9781614512639. Archived from the original on 16 January 2023.
- Sweeney, Marvin Alan (2001). King Josiah of Judah: The Lost Messiah of Israel. Oxford University Press. ISBN 9780195133240. Archived from the original on 16 January 2023.
- Sweet, R. (1994). "A New Look at the 'Sacred Marriage' in Ancient Mesopotamia". In Robbins, Emmet; Sandahl, Stella (eds.). Corolla Torontonensis : studies in honour of Ronald Morton Smith. TSAR. ISBN 9780920661222.
- Taylor, Clark L (1987). "Legends, Syncretism, and Continuing Echoes of Homosexuality from Pre-Columbian and Colonial Mexico". In Murray, Stephen O. (ed.). Male homosexuality in Central and South America. Instituto Obregón. ISBN 9780942777581. Archived from the original on 16 January 2023.
- Trexler, Richard C. (1995). Sex and conquest: gendered violence, political order, and the European conquest of the Americas. Cornell University Press.
- Westenholz, Joan Goodnick (1989). "Tamar, Qědēšā, Qadištu, and Sacred Prostitution in Mesopotamia". The Harvard Theological Review. 82 (3): 245–265. doi:10.1017/S0017816000016199. ISSN 0017-8160. JSTOR 1510077. S2CID 162848021.
- Williams, Miriam (1998). Heaven's Harlots: My Fifteen Years as a Sacred Prostitute in the Children of God Cult. Eagle Brook. ISBN 9780688155049.
- Yamauchi, Edwin M. (1973). "Cultic Prostitution: a Case Study in Cultural Diffusion". In Hoffner, Harry A. (ed.). Orient and Occident: Essays Presented to Cyrus H. Gordon on the Occasion of His Sixty-fifth Birthday. Butzon & Bercker. ISBN 9783766688057.
- Yarshater, Ehsan (1983). The Cambridge History of Iran. Cambridge University Press. ISBN 9780521200929. Archived from the original on 16 January 2023.
