= Temple of Aphrodite at Acrocorinth =

Temple of Aphrodite in Corinth

The Temple of Aphrodite at Acrocorinth was located in a sanctuary on the acropolis in Ancient Corinth dedicated to the goddess Aphrodite. It was the main temple of Aphrodite in Corinth, and famous for its alleged temple prostitution.

== History ==
The goddess Aphrodite was the protector deity of the city of Corinth. She had at least three sanctuaries in the city; the temple of Aphrodite at the Acrocorinth, the temple of Aphrodite II, and the Temple of Aphrodite Kraneion, as well as one temple at Leachaion and one at Cenchreae. It was however the Aphrodite temple of Acrocorinth that was the most famous.

The temple was constructed in the 5th century BC. It was situated at the top peak of the Acrocorinth. According to myth, the Acrocorinth had been given to Aphrodite by Helius. The temple was a relatively small building, 10 by 16 metres (33' x 52'). It contained a famous statue of Armed Aphrodite, dressed in armour and holding a shield before herself as a mirror.

The later history of the temple is not clearly established. In 146 BC, the city of Ancient Corinth was destroyed, and many of the sanctuaries atop the Acrocorinth were abandoned, if not destroyed. When the city of Roman Corinth was established in 44 BC, many of the former sanctuaries were rebuilt, such as the Temple of Apollo and the Sanctuary of Demeter and Kore on Acrocorinth. It appears that the Temple of Aphrodite at Acracorinth was also rebuilt. The temple appears on many coins from the Roman era, and Pausanias described the temple in the 1st century:

On the summit of the Acrocorinthus is a temple of Aphrodite. The images are Aphrodite armed, Helius, and Eros with a bow. The spring, which is behind the temple, they say was the gift of Asopus to Sisyphus.

The remains of the temple were used as a part of a church in the 5th century AD.

== Temple prostitution ==
The Temple of Aphrodite at Acrocorinth is above all famous for the unverified claims of the temple prostitution of courtesans, which were alleged to be dedicated to the service of the temple, and contributed to the attraction of visitors to the city of Corinth. The alleged temple prostitution is famous by the descriptions made by Strabo:

The temple of Aphrodite [in Korinthos in the days of the tyrant Kypselos] was so rich that it owned more than a thousand temple slaves, courtesans, whom both men and women had dedicated to the goddess. And therefore it was also on account of these women that the city was crowded with people and grew rich; for instance, the ship captains freely squandered their money, and hence the proverb, ‘Not for every man is the voyage to Korinthos.’ . . . Now the summit [of the Akrokorinthos] has a small temple of Aphrodite; and below the summit is the spring Peirene . . . At any rate, Euripides says, ‘I am come, having left Akrokorinthos that is washed on all sides, the sacred hill-city of Aphrodite.’ [...] Korinthos, there, on account of the multitude of courtesans, who were sacred to Aphrodite, outsiders resorted in great numbers and kept holiday. And the merchants and soldiers who went there squandered all their money so that the following proverb arose in reference to them: 'Not for every man is the voyage to Korinthos."

The actual occurrence of temple prostitution at Acrocorinth is however unconfirmed, and there is dispute about the number of prostitutes, and about their alleged connection to the temple of Aphrodite. The work of gender researchers like Daniel Arnaud, Julia Assante and Stephanie Budin has cast the whole tradition of scholarship that defined the concept of sacred prostitution into doubt. Budin regards the concept of sacred prostitution as a myth, arguing taxatively that the practices described in the sources were misunderstandings of either non-remunerated ritual sex or non-sexual religious ceremonies, possibly even mere cultural slander. Although popular in modern times, this view has not gone without being criticized in its methodological approach, including accusations of an ideological agenda.

== See also ==
- List of Ancient Greek temples

== Sources ==
- Arnaud, Daniel (1973). "La prostitution sacrée en Mésopotamie, un mythe historiographique?". Revue de l'Histoire des Religions (183): 111–115.
- Assante, Julia (2003). "From Whores to Hierodules: the Historiographic Invention of Mesopotamian Female Sex Professionals". In Donohue, A. A.; Fullerton, Mark D. (eds.). Ancient Art and its Historiography. Cambridge University Press. ISBN 9780521815673.
- Baugh, S. M. (September 1999). "Cult Prostitution In New Testament Ephesus: A Reappraisal". Journal of the Evangelical Theological Society. 42 (3): 443–460.
- Budin, Stephanie Lynn (2008). The Myth of Sacred Prostitution in Antiquity. Cambridge University Press. ISBN 9780521880909.
- Engels, Donald. Roman Corinth: An Alternative Model for the Classical City
- Ipsen, Avaren (2014). Sex Working and the Bible. Routledge. ISBN 9781317490661.
- Rickard, Kelley (2015). "A Brief Study into Sacred Prostitution in Antiquity". ResearchGate.
- Smith, Amy C.; Pickup, Sadie. Brill's Companion to Aphrodite
