= Sacred prostitution in ancient Greece =

Sacred prostitution, also known as temple or cult prostitution, involved various activities in ancient times, many of which that occurred in Greece were in some way related to the Greek Goddess Aphrodite and the Greek city of Corinth. In ancient times women’s bodies were viewed as more sexually desirable than men’s because of their potential fertility, and sexuality and fertility were celebrated for these aspects of them. This led to an interest in prostitution, and sacred prostitution was a form of prostitution in which people dedicated either themselves or their children to their deity as a form of religious worship.

== Corinth and Aphrodite ==
Corinth played a central role in influencing Greek culture due to its location. Corinth is a port city that is located between Athens and Sparta, and it offers trade through land and sea, making it more wealthy than other cities. Corinth’s neighbors saw it as an external location, separate from the others’ customs and ways of life. Corinth, where the Goddess of love Aphrodite was born, was also known for sexuality. Corinth's temples were considered the most socially accepting to prostitution. Greek geographer Strabo described Corinth’s lust to the civilians. He said that the temple of Aphrodite once had acquired more than a thousand prostitutes, donated by both men and women to the service of the Goddess. In this temple, 1,000 girls worked in this manner to gather funds for their deity. Cypriot women, called Propoetides, were forced to act as prostitutes for Aphrodite, and these women acted as surrogates to Aphrodite in that through these sexual activities they were generating fertility for Cyprus.

There was also an annual festival in Cyprus that included performing sexual activities for Aphrodite herself. Part of the activity was for the worshippers to give gifts to Aphrodite, and in return receive phalluses if they showed favor in her eyes. This ritual represented the affirmation at the time for the need of sexual power and activity.

The temple of Ourania, which was one dedicated to Aphrodite, was the place in which Aphrodite would be intimate with her sacred prostitutes. In this temple, women would enter with the intention of performing sexual activities for payment, which they would then provide to the temple. There was an area of the temple that was dedicated to bathing for after the intercourse occurred. The law at the time required all those involved in the intercourse to wash themselves if the activity took place during the daytime, but not if it did at night. This temple was very well respected and was always rampant with temple servants, titled hierodouloi, who had been dedicated by Sicilians and foreigners in fulfillment of vows.

Another activity encompassed in the overarching category of sacred prostitution was described by Greek scholar Herodotus in his book titled The Histories, in which he partly wrote about women’s roles in their cultures. He wrote that every woman, who were titled “horae,” must go to Aphrodite’s temple and have intercourse with a stranger at least once and then receive money from the stranger as a sacred act. Once the intercourse is over, she has fulfilled her sacred duty and she goes home.

The temple prostitutes in Corinth had fees which estimated around 1,000 drachmas. Strabo also wrote that in respect of Greek Goddess Anaitis, there have been temples built to honor her and male and female virgin slaves have been dedicated to her there. After engaging in this type of prostitution at the temple of Anaitis, no one would want to marry these women. Similar activities occurred in Cyprus for Aphrodite.

== Cultic brothels ==
There were also rituals that prostitutes participated in that were considered more cultic, and these involved saying prayers and burning incense along with participation in venal sex with a deity who worked alongside Aphrodite at the rituals. The National Archaeological Museum in Athens presents two slabs that were excavated that depict these events in the cultic brothels. On the slabs are naked winged Erotes, which can be defined as winged Gods associated with love and sexual intercourse in Ancient Greek mythology. The Erotes were decorated with wreaths on their heads, and the buns in their hair removed speculation of their gender. The slabs pictured them holding wine pitchers, bowls, and incense burners that were all used as part of the ritual.

In some of the cultic brothels, various prostitutes donated their earnings from the sexual intercourse to finding new temples to serve as cultic brothels. These prostitutes would also use what they believed to be the image of god to help them find a new, aloof location to institute another brothel. Many famous Greek prostitutes had begun their work through a cult and enhanced their reputations because of their stellar performances in these cultic brothels.

== Argument against sacred prostitution ==
There is much of a debate as to whether sacred prostitution did truly exist in these ancient times. For example, Strabo points out that these “supposed” customs, which included having greater than 1,000 slaves located in a temple, would not be physically feasible, thus being clearly hyperbolic. Additionally, Strabo argues that though scholars had proclaimed that Corinthian women were involved in sacred prostitution, the only references to this in writing through the phrase “ἐργαζομένων ἀπὸ τοῦ σώματος”. However, the direct translation of this phrase is women that were “working with their bodies,” and so Strabo and others determined that this could be referring to women’s work with vines and, therefore, this phrase could be in reference to their body usage in regards to fieldwork. Strabo also argues that, though the word “heitairai”, which is often used to describe these women, have sexual connotations in ancient Greek texts, sexual terms were also used to simply describe the dedication of servants to their gods, which in this case would be Aphrodite.

Some have difficulty believing that the practice of sacred prostitution did exist because of the seeming contradiction of the phrasing. In many religions, sex is often considered an activity that is not sacred, thus making the term an oxymoron in this view. Those argue that people made assumptions of the related activities based on the terminology when in reality the stories are exaggerated or completely untrue and invented about a foreign people in an effort to discredit the people thought to be involved. Ancient historian Stephanie Lynn Budin argues this same point. Budin and many other Classicists deny the possibility of sacred prostitution in Corinth specifically, they do believe that it occurred in the Near East. They argue that there is no direct proof of sacred prostitution there, but rather the notion was fabricated to disgrace the culture. Another argument that Budin makes is in relation to the Letter of Jeremiah. Verse 43 reads, “The women also with cords about them, sitting in the ways, burn bran for perfume: but if any of them, drawn by some that passeth by, lie with him, she reproacheth her fellow, that she was not thought as worthy as herself, nor her cord broken.” Many interpret this as temple prostitution, but Budin says that it does not make a reference to a temple or deity, it cannot be used as proof of such.
