= Puellae gaditanae =

Ancient erotic dancers from southern Hispania Baetica

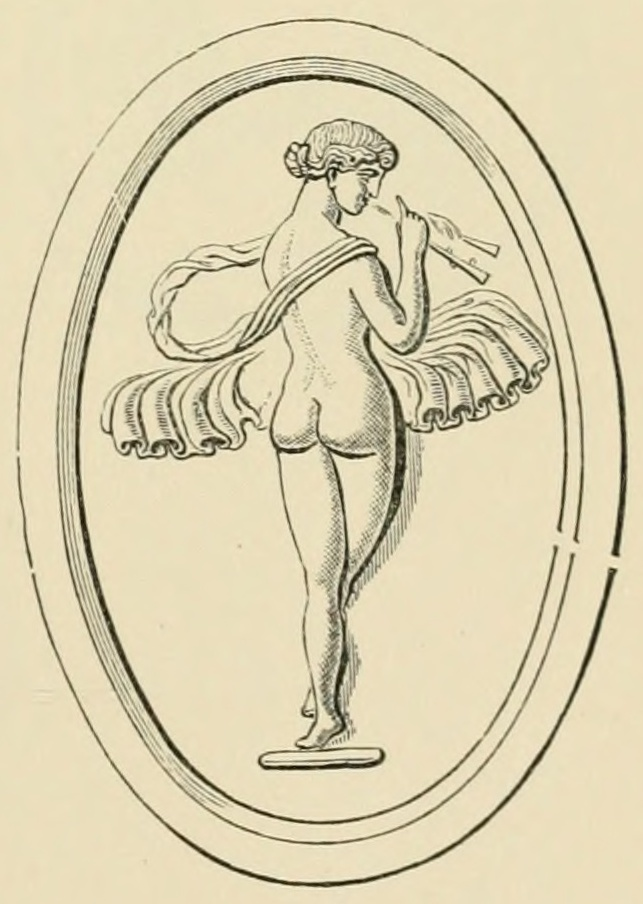
Dancing-girl making a pirouette to the sound of the double-pipe

Puellae gaditanae (Latin: 'girls from Gades') was the name that, by extension, the ancient Romans gave to all the female dancers from southern Hispania Baetica, whether or not they were from Gades (Cádiz).

== Accounts ==
The earliest references to the puellae gaditanae are found in Strabo's account of Eudoxus of Cyzicus, who embarked from Cádiz in the 2nd century BC with the aim of circumnavigating Africa, and took young musicians in his crew. It is not known with certainty if they were dancers, singers, instrumentalists or prostitutes, or perhaps all at once.

=== Martial ===
Martial says that after the triumphal entry of Quintus Caecilius Metellus into Rome, after the Sertorian War (around 74 BC), his entourage included some Andalusian girls who danced and who attracted attention for their "mischievous and playful feet" and for their crusmata baetica ("metal castanets"). Elsewhere, Martial highlights the sensual qualities of these dancers and that they sang, murmuring, love songs. The poet Juvenal, a contemporary of Martial, makes similar references, detailing that in their dances they descended towards the ground until they touched it, which was highly applauded by the populace. Other authors state that women from Cadiz cultivated lyric poetry before the Christian era.

In Rome, the dancers from Cadiz were as famous as the Syrian ones and equally desired and exciting in dancing and singing. Their presence was obligatory in many sumptuous feasts at Rome. Martial describes one of them in the following terms:

She who was cunning to show wanton gestures to the sound of Baetic castanets and to frolic to the tunes of Gades, (Note: cf. Mart. v. 78. 26.) she who could have roused passion in palsied Pelias, and have stirred Hecuba's spouse (Note: The father of Jason and Priam respectively, both typical old men) even by Hector's pyre—Telethusa burns and racks with love her former master. He sold her as his maid, now he buys her back as mistress.

In Rome shameless dance teachers taught the dances and songs of Cádiz. Martial describes this dance:

She waves her loins and hips with such quivering movements, she is so sweetly lewd, that she would make Hippolytus himself a masturbator.

Martial invites his friend Toranius to a meal at his house, but warns him that he will not animate the feast with dancers from Gades:

My poor dinner is a small one—who can deny it?—but you will say no word insincere nor hear one, and, wearing your natural face, will recline at ease; nor will your host read a bulky volume, nor will girls from wanton Gades with endless prurience swing lascivious loins in practised writhings; but the pipe of little Condylus shall play something not too solemn nor unlively.

Humming in Rome licentious songs from Egypt or Gades, which made Gades dancers fashionable, was proof of being effeminate, according to Martial:

Cotilus, you are "a pretty fellow": many call you so, Cotilus; I hear them. But, tell me, what is a pretty fellow? "A pretty fellow is one who arranges neatly his curled locks, who continually smells of balsam, continually of cinnamon; who hums catches from the Nile and Gades; who waves his depilated arms in time to varied measures; who all the day lolls amid the women's chairs, and is ever whispering in some ear; who reads billets sent from one quarter or another, and writes them; who shrinks from contact with the cloak on his neighbour's elbow; (Note: For fear it should soil or disarrange his dress: cf. Mart. ii. 41. 10.) who knows who is the lover of whom; who hurries from one party to another; who has at his fingers' ends the long pedigree of Hirpinus." (Note: A racehorse: Juv. viii. 62.)

Martial gives the name and performance of one of these dancers from Gades; she was called Telethusa. She is described in one epigram, and he dedicates other epigrams to her. Martial awaits the arrival of Telethusa to drink in her company:

Whose labour is in the bowl? was it of artist Mys or of Myron? Is this Mentor's hand, or, Polyclitus, thine? (Note: All Greek artists of past days, renowned for chasing or sculpture.) No darkness gives it a dull leaden hue, nor is it a cloudy mass that shrinks from assaying fires. True amber is less radiant than its yellow ore, and the fine frosted silver surpasses snow-white ivory. The workmanship yields not to the material: even so the moon rounds her orb when she shines in fullness with all her light. There stands a he-goat prankt in the Aeolian fleece of Theban Phryxus; (Note: The golden fleece of the ram that bore Phryxus and Helle over the sea: cf. Mart. viii. 28. 20.) by such his sister would more gladly have been borne; such a goat no Cinyphian barber (Note: cf. Mart. vii. 95. 13.) would deform, and thou thyself, Lyaeus, wouldst consent to his cropping thine own vine. (Note: Juv. alludes to this: i. 76 (stantem extra pocula caprum).) A Love in gold, two-winged, loads the back of the beast; the pipe of Pallas sounds from his tender lips; in such wise the dolphin, blithe with the burden of Methymnaean Arion, (Note: A celebrated harpist, who, to escape the crew of the vessel carrying him to Corinth with his wealth, leaped, it is said, into the sea after playing a last time on his harp: cf. Herod. i. 23, 24.) bore him, no unmelodious freight, o'er tranquil seas. Let no hand from the master's crowd of slaves, only thy hand, Cestus, first fill this peerless gift for me with fitting nectar; Cestus, the banquet's pride, mix thou the Setine: the very boy, the very goat, methinks, is athirst. Let the letters of Istantius Rufus' (Note: A friend of Martial: cf. Mart. viii. 73. 1.) name assign their number to our measures of wine, (Note: As to this practice, cf. ix. 93. 8; xi. 36. 8.) for he was the source to me of so proud a gift. If Telethusa come, and bring her promised joys, I will keep myself for my mistress, Rufus, by drinking your four measures; (Note: cf. Mart. i. 106.) if she be doubtful, I shall while away the time by seven; if she fail her lover, then, to throttle care, I will drink both your names. (Note: Martial intends to drink to the vocative, i.e. Rufe, Istanti, etc.)

=== Juvenal ===
Juvenal confirms the description of Martial, writing:

You may look perhaps for a troop of Spanish maidens to win applause by immodest dance and song, sinking down with quivering thighs to the floor—such sights as brides behold seated beside their husbands, though it were a shame to speak of such things in their presence. … My humble home has no place for follies such as these. The clatter of castanets, words too foul for the strumpet that stands naked in a reeking archway, with all the arts and language of lust, may be left to him who spits wine upon floors of Lacedaemonian marble; such men we pardon because of their high station.

== Historiography ==
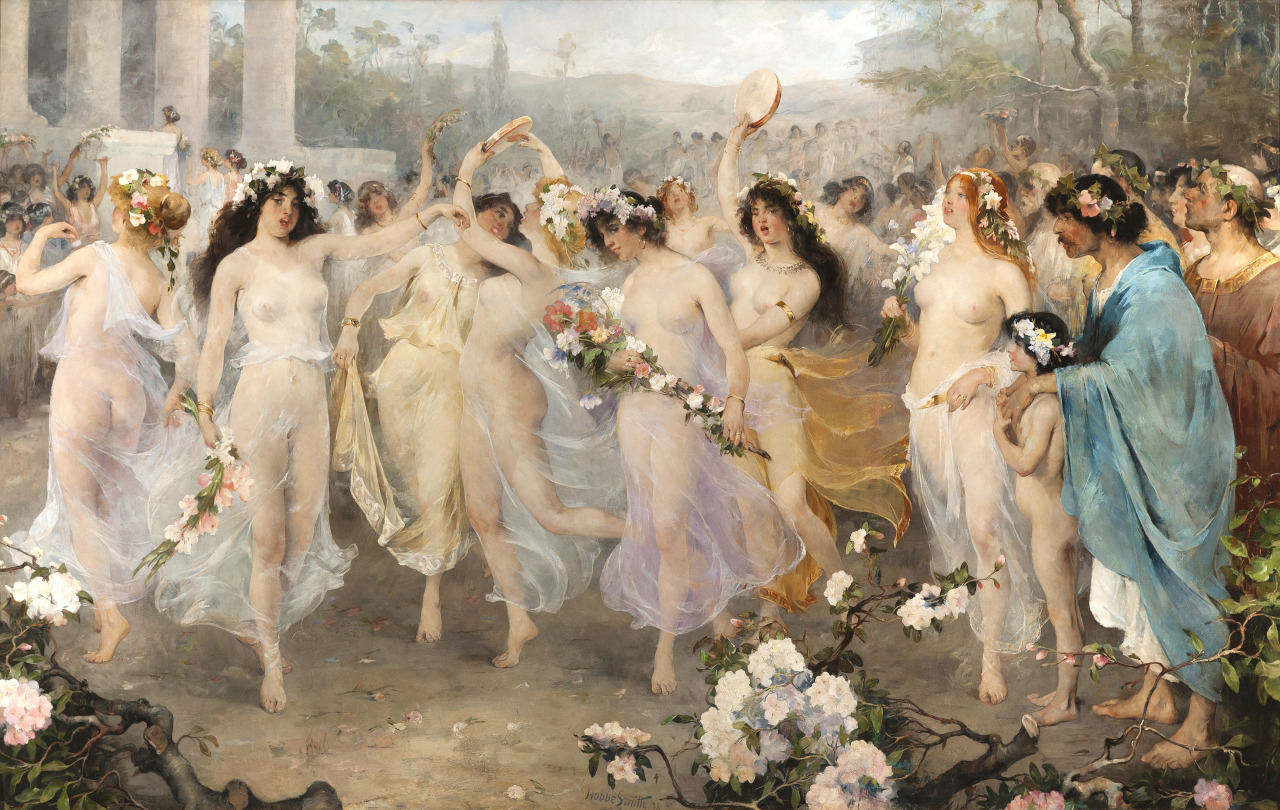
Hobbe Smith: Floralia (1898)

Some writers have suggested a connection between the survival and flourishing of the puellae gaditanae in the Roman world and the broader institution of sacred prostitution that formed around the cult of the Phoenician Astarte, the Greek Aphrodite and the Roman Venus. Joaquín Costa in his book Las juglaresas gaditanas en el Imperio Romano dates them to an earlier date, locating their origin in the "noisy choirs and dances with which the Bastetani celebrated their tribal or family festivals".

== See also ==
- Hetaira
- Soldadeira
- Flamenco

== Sources ==
=== Primary ===
- Anonymous (1868). The Index Expurgatorius of Martial. London: Printed for Private Circulation. pp. 138–139.
- Jones, Horace Leonard (1917). The Geography of Strabo I. London: William Heinemann; New York: G. P. Putnam's Sons. pp. 380–381.
- Ker, Walter C. A. (1919). Martial: Epigrams I. London: William Heinemann; New York: G. P. Putnam's Sons. pp. 202–203, 349–351, 404–405.
- Ker, Walter C. A. (1920). Martial: Epigrams II. London: William Heinemann; New York: G. P. Putnam's Sons. pp. 38–41, 282–285, 510–511.
- Melmoth, William; Hutchinson, W. M. L. (1905). Pliny: Letters I. London: William Heinemann; New York: The Macmillan Co. pp. 52–53.
- Ramsay, G. G. (1928). Juvenal and Persius. London: William Heinemann; New York: G. P. Putnam's Sons. pp. 232–233.

=== Secondary ===
- Calero, Luis; Bernard, Gaël (January 2014). «Las puellae gaditanae, una coreografía con acento propio». Anas, 27: pp. 107–120.
- Colubi Falcó, J. M. (1999). «Condición social jurídica de la puella gaditana». HABIS, 30: pp. 307–314.
- Fear, A. T. (April 1991). "The Dancing Girls of Cadiz". Greece & Rome, 38(1): 75–79.
- Mayorga González, Antonio (December 2009). «Nuestros remotos antepasados: mastienos-Bastetanos y Fenicios». Isla de Arriarán, 34: pp. 47–57.
- Miravelles, Luis (2007). «La tradición oral: de la lírica popular al cante flamenco». Revista de Folklore, 315. Fundación Joaquín Díaz.
- Olmos, Ricardo (30 December 1991). ««Puellae Gaditanae»: ¿Heteras de Astarté?». Archivo Español de Arqueología, 64(163–164): pp. 99–109.
