= Rui Queimado =

Portuguese troubadour

Illustration that opens Rui Queimado's section in the Cancioneiro da Ajuda

Rui (or Roi) Queimado was a 13th-century Portuguese trovador. His family belonged to the petty nobility of the valley of the Vez and he seems to have been active in Castile in the 1240s. The themes of his verses reflect those of the circle around Alfonso X. He was the target of cantiga de escárnio e maldizer (insult song) from the Castilian trovador Pero Garcia Burgalês.

== List of works ==
There are 24 songs attributed to Rui across three genres: cantiga de amigo (friend song), cantiga de amor (love song) and cantiga de escárnio e maldizer. Rui also wrote three songs that do not fit neatly into the standard genre classifications.

=== Cantigas de amigo ===
- Dizem-mi ora que nom verrá
- O meu amig', ai amiga
- O meu amigo, que me mui gram bem
- Quando meu amigo souber

=== Cantigas de amor ===
- Agora viv'eu como querria
- Cuidades vós, mia senhor, que mui mal
- De mia senhor direi-vos que mi avém
- Deste mund'outro bem nom querria
- Direi-vos que mi aveo, mia senhor
- Fiz meu cantar e loei mia senhor
- Nostro Senhor Deus! e por que neguei
- Nostro Senhor! e ora que será
- Nunca fiz cousa de que me tam bem
- Pois minha senhor me manda (possibly not by Rui)
- Sempr'ando cuidando em meu coraçom
- Senhor fremosa, vejo-vos queixar
- Senhor, que Deus mui melhor parecer

=== Cantigas de escárnio e maldizer ===
- Dom Estêvam, em grand'entençom
- Dom Marco, vej'eu muito queixar
- O Demo m'houvera hoj'a levar
- Querri'agora saber de grado

=== Uncertain genre ===
Rui's three songs beyond genre are:

- Pois que eu ora morto for
- Por mia senhor fremosa quer'eu bem
- Preguntou Joam Garcia

Preguntou Joam Garcia is written in the style of a cantiga de amor with features taken from the cantiga de escárnio. The short Pois que eu ora morto for is its continuation, having features of the cantiga de amor. Both pieces break the rule of cantigas de amor by revealing the beloved's name, in this case Guiomar Affonso Gata.

Por mia senhor fremosa quer'eu bem is a humorous satire on the conventions of the cantiga de amor.

== Bibliography ==
- Brea, Mercedes (2005). "¿Textos discordantes no Cancioneiro da Ajuda?". In Mercedes Brea (ed.). Carolina Michaëlis e o Cancioneiro da Ajuda, hoxe. Centro Ramón Piñeiro. pp. 255–279.
- Videira Lopes, Graça; Ferreira, Manuel Pedro (2011–2026). "Cantigas Medievais Galego-Portuguesas". Instituto de Estudos Medievais, FCSH/NOVA.
- Vallín Blanco, Gema (2022). "Pero García Burgalés". Diccionario biográfico español. Real Academia de la Historia.
