= Barrio Chino de Salamanca =

Former red-light district in Salamanca, Spain

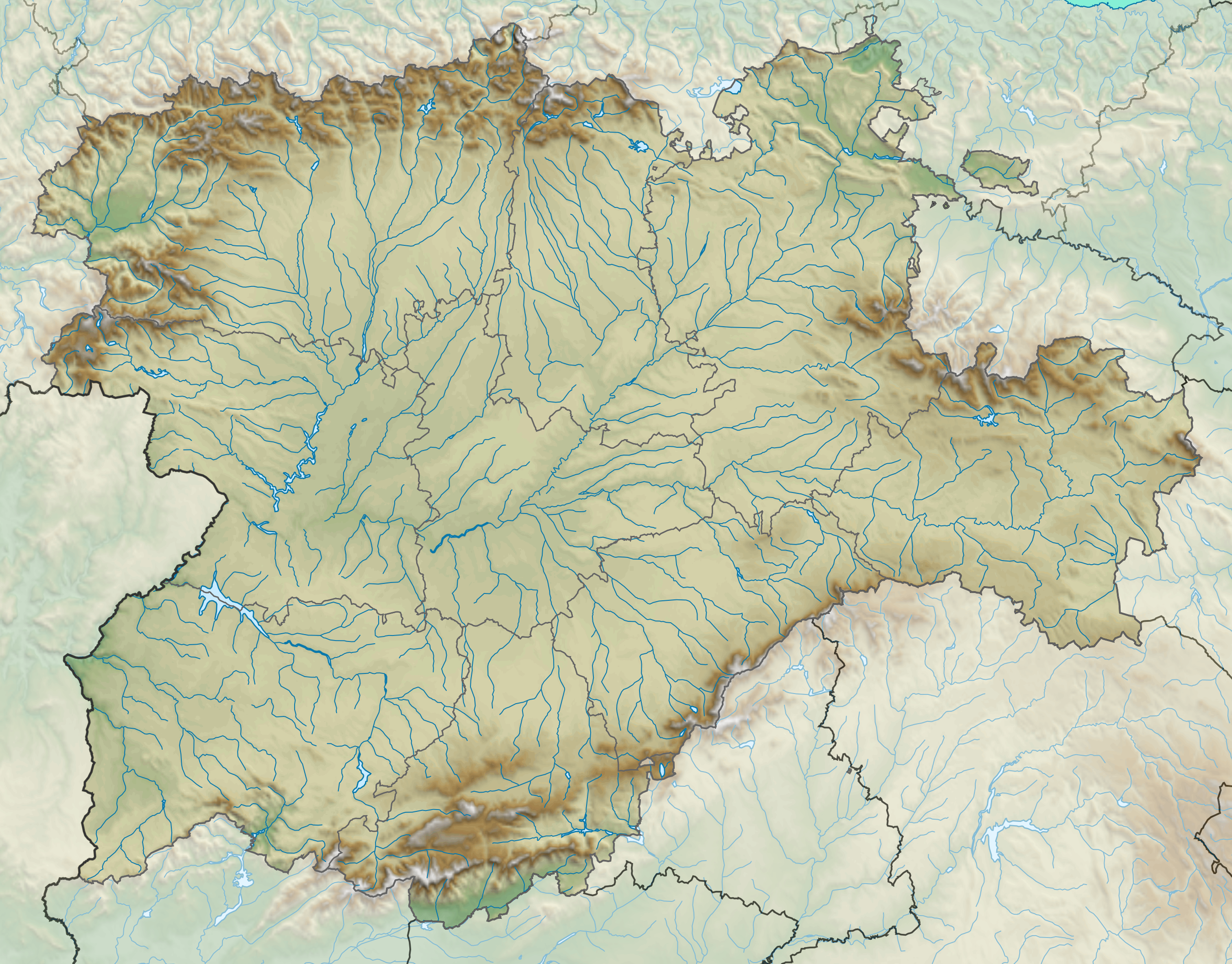
- Location within Castile and León Location within Spain
- Coordinates: 40.9628517°N 5.6719352°W
- Country: Spain
- Autonomous community: Castile and León
- Province: Province of Salamanca
- City: Salamanca

The Barrio Chino de Salamanca was the area of the city of Salamanca, Spain, where brothels and similar establishments were located. (Note: Barrio chino is the Spanish term for a red-light district. This translates literally to Chinatown in English, which has a different meaning.) Throughout its long history, its location has gradually moved from the banks of the Tormes river to the area known as Vaguada de la Palma.

== History ==
=== Golden Age ===
La Celestina (1499) is possibly the first work in which references the importance of prostitution in the area of the city of Tormes. Subsequently, much of the erotic literature of the Spanish Golden Age choose Salamanca, and in particular, its Barrio Chino as the settings for their works: La tía fingida (attributed to Miguel de Cervantes), La lozana andaluza, La Carajicomedia, La picara Justina and a large number of minor works attest to this.

Prince John, son of Ferdinand and Isabella, lived in Salamanca during his tutoring by Bishop Diego de Deza. With the bishop's agreement, organised the prostitutes of Salamanca to locate to the Casa de la Mancebía, where they should be under the supervision of a priest, who became known as the Padre Putas (father of whores).

The future King Philip II came to Salamanca for his marriage to Maria Manuela, Princess of Portugal in 1543. He was concerned about the number of prostitutes in the city and issued an edict that prostitutes should leave the city's Casa de la Mancebía during the period of annual abstinence (Lent, Holy Week and Easter). They were to be inactive and remain outside the city walls on the left bank of the river during this period. On the afternoon of the Monday after Easter, led by Padre Putas (one of the most coveted official positions of the time), they returned to the city, crossing the river in boats that the students had decorated. This annual custom became so popular that a large part of the city's inhabitants came to observe it and take part in the celebrations. This tradition is still celebrated in the city as the Monday of Waters.

To Toledo, by the sword;

to Valencia, for the fruits;
to Rioja, for bon vino

and to Salamanca, for whores

— Fernando de Rojas, La Celestina (1499)

In the 16th century, the University of Salamanca was the most important study centre in Spain, having nearly 7,000 students, so the demand for prostitutes was high. As a great variety of literary and historical sources of the time attest, the Barrio Chino de Salamanca was one of the most flourishing red-light districts in Spain during the Golden Age. The city was sometimes known as the "brothel of Europe".

=== Modern times ===
After the disappearance of many of the city walls, the "tolerance zone" gradually moved from Casa de la Mancebía to a triangular area bounded by the Convent of the Franciscan Fathers, the Church of La Purísima and the Colegio de la Compañía de Jesús (now the Pontifical university). The area had been completely destroyed during the Peninsular War by successive English and French attacks and was known as Barrio de los Caídos ("demolished" in the Salamanca language), and was in ruins. It was gradually rebuilt with the materials reclaimed from the previous destruction. At the end of the 19th century bars and brothels started to open until the area became the so-called "Barrio Chino".

Unlike the eighteenth century, when prostitution enjoyed a status of legality and even protection by the powers (royal, ecclesiastical, civil and university), the activity, although sometimes tolerated, was persecuted and despised. The Barrio Chino did continue to operate, and from the period of the Spanish Civil War until the early 1980s, the Barrio Chino de Salamanca enjoyed a period of splendour, perhaps comparable to that of the previous centuries. This period of resurgence really began, although in a more discreet way, during the reign of Alfonso XIII. It was even rumoured that Alfonso had, incognito, visited some of the highest-ranking of the brothels on his famous journey on horseback through the Province of Salamanca.

Visitors to the area were both locals and those from other provinces of the Castile and León region. Although some establishments opened until late into the night, most of the activity occurred in the daytime. In the 1960s there were 19 bars in the area as well as the brothels. Notable madams of the time were La Margot, La Peque, Petra and Dolores Campos, who was also known as Mara, who ran establishments such as La Margot, La Inés, Argentina, La Petra, La Merche, Las Conchas, La Portuguesa, La Nicolasa, and the Five Stars.

The prostitutes were mainly Spanish, had to be over 21 and carry a health card. Regular health checks were carried out at the Department of Dermatology of the General Hospital of the University of Salamanca. If the tests were clear the prostitutes could carry on working, if not they were given treatment and advise to stop working while they were being treated.

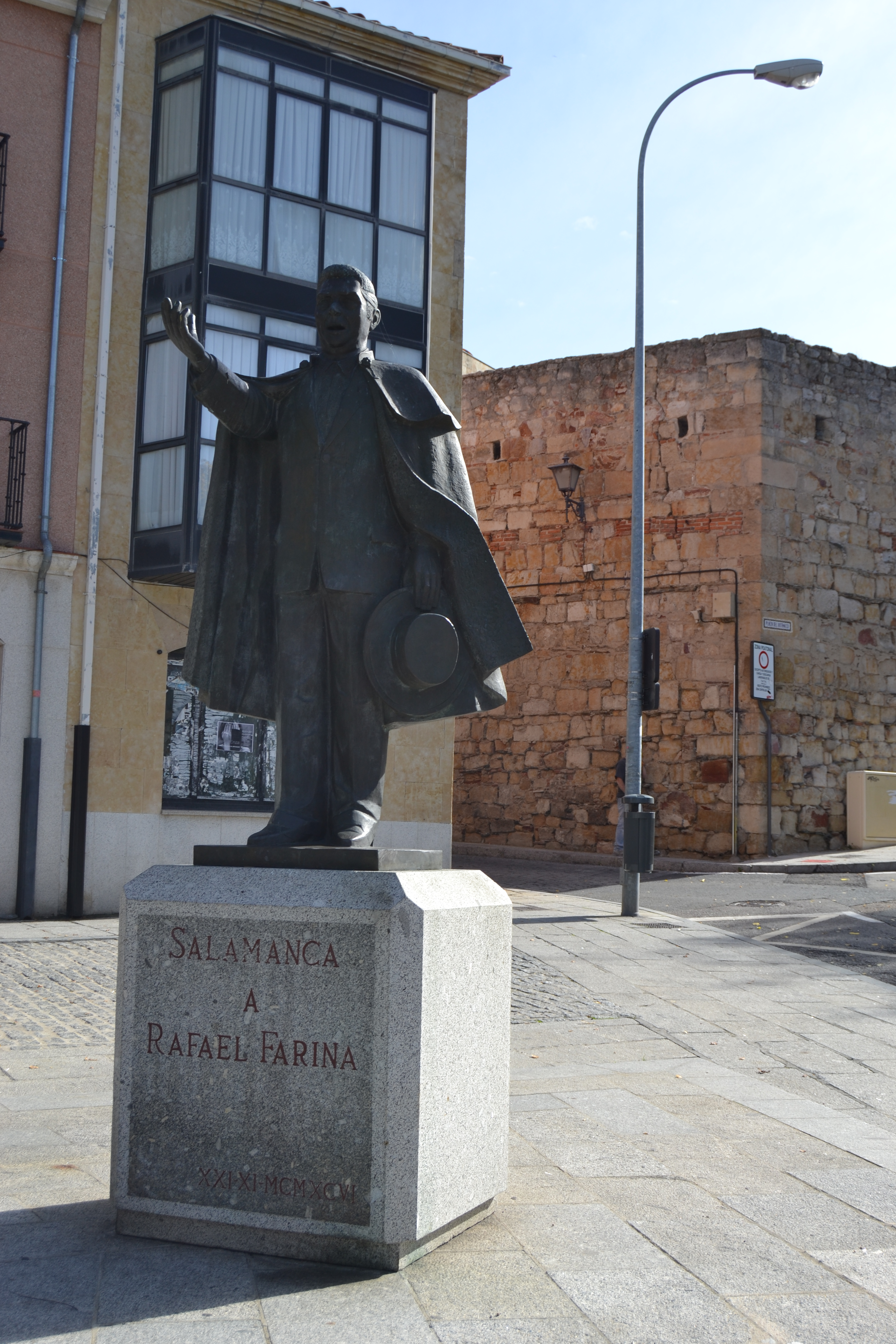
Memorial statue of Rafael Farina

The Spanish singer Rafael Farina started his career singing in the bars at the age of six. He was taken under the protection of La Margó and La Carmina. A memorial statue of him by Agustín Casillas still stands in the area.

== Decline and regeneration ==
The urban speculation sixties and seventies did not have a significant impact on the area, but in the early eighties, the area became known for heroin dealing and use and went into decline. The central location made the area ripe for regeneration, and Operación Piloto was launched with a budget of 2,000 million pesetas. New roads were constructed and some social housing built. Construction of the Palacio de Congresos was completed in 1992.

Prostitution briefly returned to the area when the 2005 Ibero-American Summit was held at the Palacio de Congresos. Prostitutes had previously warned to stay away during the congress but the warning was ignored and scuffles between prostitutes and police broke out.

The last building that had housed a brothel, the Bar el Sol, was demolished in 2006. The bronze statue of Rafael Farina and a modest house at 50 Calle Cervantes are the only remaining reminders of the Barrio Chino.

== References in classical Spanish literature ==
- La Celestina
- La tía fingida
- Portrait of Lozana: The Lusty Andalusian Woman
- La Carajicomedia
- La pícara Justina
- The Book of Good Love

== Bibliography ==
- Clarke, Patricia; Footman, David, eds. (1967). In Memoriam Archie, 1904-1964: A Symposium on Archibald Laurence Lyall by His Friends. Mrs. W. S. Clarke.
- Gómez, Miguel Casas (1986). La interdicción lingüística: mecanismos del eufemismo y disfemismo [Linguistic interdiction: mechanisms of euphemism and dysphemism] (in Spanish). Servicio de Publicaciones, Universidad de Cádiz. ISBN 9788460045915.
- Gratchev, Slav N.; Mancing, Howard (2018). Mikhail Bakhtin's Heritage in Literature, Arts, and Psychology: Art and Answerability. Rowman & Littlefield. ISBN 978-1-4985-8270-4.
- Guereña, Jean-Louis (2003). La prostitución en la España contemporánea [Prostitution in contemporary Spain] (in Spanish). Marcial Pons Historia. ISBN 978-84-95379-62-7.
- Ray, Michael, ed. (2013). Portugal and Spain. Britannica Educational Publishing. ISBN 978-1-61530-993-1.
- Resina, Joan Ramon (2013). Iberian Cities. Routledge. ISBN 978-1-136-53463-8.
- Zarza, Eugenio García (2009). "Contribución De La Actividad Universitaria Al Desarrollo, Configuración Y Ordenación Urbanísticas De Salamanca" [Contribution Of The Activity University For Development, Configuration And Ordering Urbanistics Of Salamanca]. Salamanca. Revista de Estudios (in Spanish) (57): 281–317. ISSN 0212-7105.
