= Soldadeira =

Woman dancing during theatrical performances

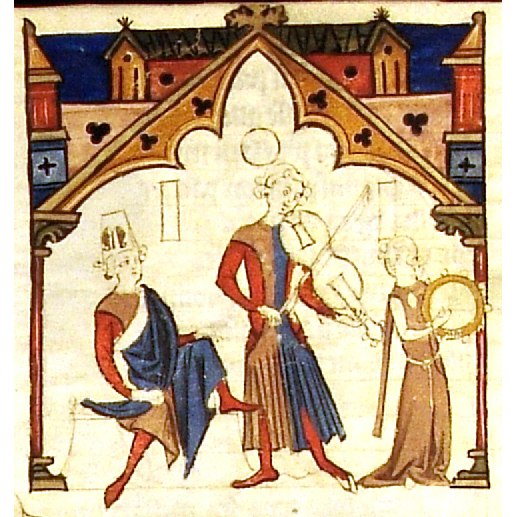
Miniature from the Cancioneiro da Ajuda, showing a soldadeira (right) dancing and playing the pandeiro.

The Galician-Portuguese term soldadeira, and the Spanish term soldadera, meant a woman of questionable morality who danced and performed gymnastic exercises during the performance of playwrights or troubadours. They have been referred to as "spiritual heirs" of the puellae gaditanae mentioned by Martial and Juvenal.

== See also ==
- Galician-Portuguese lyric
- María Pérez Balteira
- Flamenco
