= Sanctuary of Demeter and Kore on Acrocorinth =

The Sanctuary of Demeter and Kore on Acrocorinth was a temple in Ancient Corinth, dedicated to the goddesses Demeter and Kore (Persephone).

The sanctuary was situated on the Acrocorinth, where several other sanctuaries were placed, notably the Temple of Aphrodite on Acrocorinth. The sanctuary first consisted of a sacred area, which in the archaic period included a small temple. The first more elaborate temple was erected in the 4th century BC.

In 146 BC, the city of Ancient Corinth was destroyed, and the temple fell into ruins. When Roman Corinth was founded in 44 BC, the sanctuary was reestablished. In the 1st century, three small Ionic temples were built.

Pausanias described the temples of the sanctuary:

"[On the akropolis of Korinthos there is a] temple of the Moirai (Fates) and that of Demeter and Kore (the Maid) have images that are not exposed to view." [...] On the way down to the plain [in the city of Korinthos] is a sanctuary of Demeter, said to have been founded by Plemnaeis as a thank-offering to the goddess for the rearing of his son. [...] What is reported of Plemnaios [mythical king of Korinthos and a grandson of Poseidon], the son of Peratos, seemed to me very wonderful. All the children borne to him by his wife died the very first time they wailed. At last Demeter took pity on Plemnaios, came to Aigialea Sikyonia in the guise of a strange woman, and reared for Plemnaios his son Orthopolis."

The sanctuary was closed in the 4th century during the persecution of pagans in the late Roman Empire. Archeological remains indicate that the temple was attacked by Christian iconoclasts. In a Roman well situated in the sacred area, three heads of statues have been found, identified as a large head belonging to the cult statue of the goddess Demeter, and two smaller heads belonging to portrait sculptures of that of her two priestesses. The heads appear to have been decapitated from the statues, vandalised and thrown down the well. The dates of coins found at the site indicate that this incident occurred during the mid to late 4th century, a period of persecution of pagans, when temples and shrines were attacked by Christians around the Roman Empire. Excavations have been made of the remains of the sanctuary. Significant archeological finds have been made.

== Bibliography ==
Final reports

- Pemberton, Elizabeth G.; Slane, Kathleen Warner; Williams, Charles K. (1989). "The Sanctuary of Demeter and Kore: The Greek Pottery". Corinth. 18 (1): iii–234. doi:10.2307/4390701. ISSN 1558-7185.
- Slane, Kathleen Warner (1990). "The Sanctuary of Demeter and Kore: The Roman Pottery and Lamps". Corinth. 18 (2): iii–160. doi:10.2307/4390703. ISSN 1558-7185.
- Bookidis, Nancy; Stroud, Ronald S. (1997). "The Sanctuary of Demeter and Kore: Topography and Architecture". Corinth. 18 (3): iii–510. doi:10.2307/4390705. ISSN 1558-7185.
- Merker, Gloria S. (2000). "The Sanctuary of Demeter and Kore: Terracotta Figurines of the Classical, Hellenistic, and Roman Periods". Corinth. 18 (4): iii–394. doi:10.2307/4390707. ISSN 1558-7185.
- Bookidis, Nancy (2010). "The Sanctuary of Demeter and Kore: The Terracotta Sculpture". Corinth. 18 (5): iii–319. ISSN 1558-7185.
- Stroud, Ronald S. (2013). "The Sanctuary of Demeter and Kore: The Inscriptions". Corinth. 18 (6): iii–184. ISSN 1558-7185.
- Bookidis, Nancy; Pemberton, Elizabeth G. (2015). "The Sanctuary of Demeter and Kore: The Greek Lamps and Offering Trays". Corinth. 18 (7): iii–184. ISSN 1558-7185.

Preliminary Reports

- Stroud, Ronald S. (1965). "The Sanctuary of Demeter and Kore on Acrocorinth Preliminary Report I: 1961-1962". Hesperia: The Journal of the American School of Classical Studies at Athens. 34 (1): 1–24. doi:10.2307/147134. ISSN 0018-098X.
- Stroud, Ronald S. (1968). "The Sanctuary of Demeter and Kore on Acrocorinth: Preliminary Report II: 1964-1965". Hesperia: The Journal of the American School of Classical Studies at Athens. 37 (3): 299–330. doi:10.2307/147599. ISSN 0018-098X.
- Bookidis, Nancy (1969). "The Sanctuary of Demeter and Kore on Acrocorinth, Preliminary Report III: 1968". Hesperia: The Journal of the American School of Classical Studies at Athens. 38 (3): 297–310. doi:10.2307/147670. ISSN 0018-098X.
- Bookidis, Nancy; Fisher, Joan E. (1972). "The Sanctuary of Demeter and Kore on Acrocorinth Preliminary Report IV: 1969-1970". Hesperia: The Journal of the American School of Classical Studies at Athens. 41 (3): 283–331. doi:10.2307/147436. ISSN 0018-098X.
- Bookidis, Nancy; Fisher, Joan E. (1974). "Sanctuary of Demeter and Kore on Acrocorinth: Preliminary Report V: 1971-1973". Hesperia: The Journal of the American School of Classical Studies at Athens. 43 (3): 267–307. doi:10.2307/147663. ISSN 0018-098X.

Other studies

- De Maris, Richard E. (1995). "Demeter in Roman Corinth: Local Development in a Mediterranean Religion". Numen. 42 (2): 105–117.
- Brumfield, Allaire (1997). "Cakes in the Liknon: Votives from the Sanctuary of Demeter and Kore on Acrocorinth". Hesperia: The Journal of the American School of Classical Studies at Athens. 66 (1): 147–172. doi:10.2307/148477. ISSN 0018-098X.
- Bookidis, Nancy; Hansen, Julie; Snyder, Lynn; Goldberg, Paul (1999). "Dining in the Sanctuary of Demeter and Kore at Corinth". Hesperia: The Journal of the American School of Classical Studies at Athens. 68 (1): 1–54. doi:10.2307/148389. ISSN 0018-098X.
- Pfaff, Christopher A. (1999). "The Early Iron Age Pottery from the Sanctuary of Demeter and Kore at Corinth". Hesperia: The Journal of the American School of Classical Studies at Athens. 68 (1): 55–134. doi:10.2307/148390. ISSN 0018-098X.
- Slane, Kathleen Warner (2008). "The End of the Sanctuary of Demeter and Kore on Acrocorinth". Hesperia: The Journal of the American School of Classical Studies at Athens. 77 (3): 465–496. ISSN 0018-098X.
- Klinger, Sonia (2018). "Terracotta Models of Sandaled Feet: Votives from the Sanctuary of Demeter and Kore on Acrocorinth". Hesperia: The Journal of the American School of Classical Studies at Athens. 87 (3): 429–449. doi:10.2972/hesperia.87.3.0429. ISSN 0018-098X.
