= Deuki =

Nepali religious prostitution

Deuki is an ancient custom practiced in the far western regions of Nepal where a young girl is offered to the local temple. The practice is in decline.

Girls become deukis either because their parents offer them in hopes of gaining protection and good favor from the Gods or because their parents sell them to wealthier couples seeking the same holy approval. Poor families who offer up their daughters gain status and approval from their communities from the perceived sacrifice they have made. They are also relieved of the burden of finding husbands for their daughters.

After offering the girls to the temples, neither parents nor couples who bought them provide any financial assistance or have additional contact with deukis. Because they are considered unfit for marriage and receive no money from those that dedicated them to their temples, deukis have to depend on worshipers’ monetary offerings to the temple. Left with insufficient income, no skills or education, and pressure brought on by the folkloric conviction that sex with a deuki can cleanse sins and bring good luck, many deukis are driven to survival sex, a form of prostitution in which sex is traded for basic necessities such as food or shelter.

Due to the existing law stating that Nepalese citizenship falls along the father's line, daughters born to deukis, known as devis, usually cannot become citizens of Nepal. Denied access to education and other social services, many devis become deukis. Though a legislative change in 2006 makes it slightly easier for deukis to get citizenship for their children if they can prove that the father is Nepalese, matrilineal descent remains unrecognized.

== History ==
Traditionally, deuki girls were offered to temples at the age of five or six–while they were still “pure”–as sacred temple slaves or temple dancers. They performed various services for the temple to which they had been offered until they reached puberty, at which point they were expected to provide sexual services for male priests and worshippers.

The role of deukis in society was once quite different from its current stigmatized reality. In her dissertation, Robynne A. Locke describes the ancient deukis' status:

1.In the past, teenage girls dedicated to temples occupied a high status in society. Elaborate public ceremonies and feasting occurred to legitimize their dedication to the temple and marriage to God, and their role as a caretaker of the temple was valued and respected. For their service, women were granted a parcel of temple property and accumulated wealth through donations to God.

As time went on, however, the patronage of the temples fell and this version of the system disappeared. Though deukis still receive some respect for their holy status, it is rarely expressed monetarily. Today, deukis are frequently raped by a priest immediately after dedication- still when they are between five and seven years old. Abandoned by their parents and all other support systems, these girls grow up largely on their own with no education or learned skills. In recent scholarship, some authors have asserted that the sex trafficking problem in Nepal has roots in traditions like deuki, which created the precedent of women being viewed more like objects and symbols than like people. Others assert that the presence of deuki in communities simply leaves their populations predisposed to accept such practices.

== Deuki today ==
The practice of deuki has been formally abolished by the Nepalese government. Despite this fact, girls continue to become deukis. The Nepal Constitution of 1990 deemed the practice to be human trafficking and exploitation in the name of religion and culture, and several pieces of legislation have passed that should have curtailed the number of Deukis. According to a UN report, however, the number of deukis increased between 1992 and 2010. The actual number of deukis today is contestable, as the exact statistics are unavailable. Estimates range from under 2,000 to over 30,000, leaving a great deal of uncertainty.

Nevertheless, the government seems determined to crack down on deuki and other trafficking practices that have been prevalent in Western Nepal for so long. According to Sher Jung Karki, undersecretary at the Ministry of Women, Children, and Social Welfare, a new bill aimed at protecting women from various types of abuse would help with these measures as “each and every act that promotes discrimination and violence against women in the name of religion and customs will be considered a punishable offense.” This bill, implemented earlier this year, creates greater responsibility for perpetrators of such offenses, including the sale and dedication of young girls, by broadening the definition of abuse and by making its consequences more severe with mandatory compensation (including treatment expenses for physical and psychological abuse) to the victim and jail time.

NGOs such as Jandesh have worked to successfully rehabilitate many Deukis by teaching them “skills in the sewing, stitching, cattle farming, cottage and beauty industries, as well as [providing] literacy classes” and getting their children into schools. For older deukis, however, change is more difficult. Government programs and NGOs are less invested in their rehabilitation, so they receive less assistance. Such women also find it harder to transition into a different lifestyle after an entire lifetime of being a deuki.

== See also ==
- Devadasi
- Religious prostitution
- Ritual servitude
