= María Pérez Balteira =

Galician female troubadour

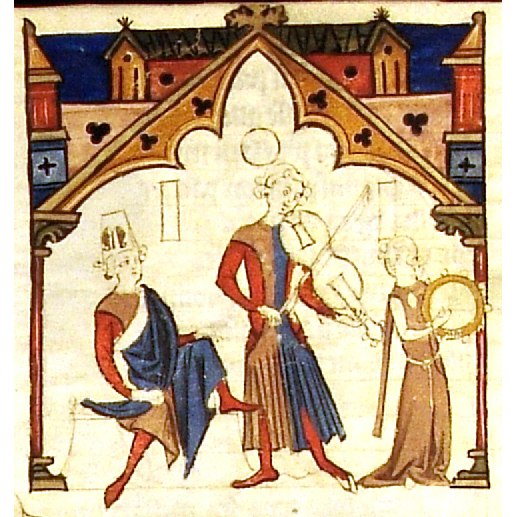
Miniature from the Cancioneiro da Ajuda, showing a soldadeira (right) dancing and playing the pandeiro. This miniature illustrates the collection of Pero Garcia Burgalês, who addressed a song to María.

María Pérez (fl. 13th-century), called La Balteira ("the Balteira"), was a Galician trobairitz and soldadeira.

María Pérez was a composer and singer who wrote sacred plainsong, performed in the courts of Europe, and was somewhat of an adventurer.

She was popular at the courts of Ferdinand III of Castile and Alfonso X of Castile, and the latter dedicated a song to her.

== Bibliography ==
- Abelleira, Fernando Magán (1996). Lírica profana galego-potuguesa. Vol. 1. Galicia: Centro Ramón Piñeiro. pp. 39, 149, 421.
- Abelleira, Fernando Magán (2007). "María Pérez, Balteira, ou, María Balteira na literatura medieval. Escolma de textos". Consello da Cultura Galega, Comisión de Igualdade. pp. 1–13.
- Alvar, Carlos (1985). "María Pérez, Balteira". Aragonese Philology Archive, no. 36. pp. 11–40.
- Amil, Iván Fernández (22 November 2020). "María Pérez la Balteira, la gallega que conquistó Jerusalén y la Corte de Alfonso X". Quincemil, El Español. Retrieved 20 April 2022.
- Campo, Marica (2007). "María Balteira" Archived 2 July 2022 at the Wayback Machine. Álbum de mulleres. Consello da Cultura Galega. Retrieved 19 April 2022.
- Commire, Anne, ed. (2001). Women in World History: A Biographical Encyclopedia. Vol. 12: O–Q. Waterford, CT: Yorkin Publications, Gale Group. ISBN 0787640719, 9780787640712.
- Commire, Anne, ed. (2007). "Perez, Maria". In Dictionary of Women Worldwide: 25,000 Women through the Ages. Vol. 2: M–Z. Farmington Hills, MI: Thomson Gale. p. 1,498.
- Díaz, Esther Corral (2016). "Maria Balteira, a Woman Crusader of Outremer". In Gonzáles-Paz, Carlos Andrés (ed.). Women and Pilgrimage in Medieval Galicia. Routledge: New York: pp. 65–80.
- Lopes, Maria da Graça Videira (1994). A Sátira nos cancioneiros medievais galego-portugueses. Lisbon: Imprensa universitária, editorial estampa. pp. 221–225. ISBN 9723310791.
- Ventura, Joaquim (September 2017). "O contrato de de María Pérez Balteira con Sobrado". Grial: revista galega de cultura, vol. LV, no. 215. pp. 134–141.
- Ruiz, Joaquim Ventura (2015). "A verdadeira cruzada de María Pérez «Balteira»". In Alvar, Carlos (ed.). Estudios de literatura medieval en la Península Ibérica. San Millán de la Cogolla: Cilengua. pp. 1,167–1,182.
