= Pero Garcia Burgalês =

Start of Pero's lyrics in the Cancioneiro da Ajuda

Pero Garcia Burgalês (Old Spanish: Pero García Burgalés) was a 13th-century Castilian poet and composer of Galician-Portuguese lyrics. He was one of the most prolific of the trovadores, with over 50 songs to his name.

== Life ==
Nothing is known for certain of Pero's life beyond what can be deduced from his name and his songs. His literary associations place him the circle around Alfonso X. The nickname Burgalês implies an association with Burgos and there are at least three theories as to his identity.

Xavier Ron Fernández identifies the poet with a Pero García known from at least three documents dating. In a document from before 1250, he is referred to as a resident of Santo Domingo de la Calzada not far from Burgos. In 1238, he received land in the Repartiment of Valencia. In 1264, he received land after the conquest of Jerez.

Carolina Michaëlis de Vasconcelos proposes to identify the poet with a jogral (minstrel) of Burgos named Pero García mentioned in the will of Count Pedro de Barcelos from 1350. This Pero was the father-in-law of a certain Aparizio Pérez, to whom Pedro owed money. Both Aparizio and Pero were dead at the time the will was drawn up, so that the minstrel of Burgos may have lived two generations earlier. It is not impossible that Pero the composer was also Pero the performer (i.e., minstrel).

Joaquim Ventura also identifies Pero Garcia Burgalês with a known minstrel of Burgos, a certain Pedro Agudo who is mocked as a cuckold in two songs of Pero da Ponte and alluded to in one of Gonçalo Anes do Vinhal. The theories of Ventura and Michaëlis are not mutually exclusive.

== Works ==
The website Cantigas medievais galego-portuguesas lists 53 songs under Pero's name, here listed alphabetically by genre.

=== Cantigas de amigo ===
Pero wrote only two cantigas de amigo.

- Ai madre, bem vos digo
- Nom vos nembra, meu amigo

=== Cantigas de amor ===
Pero favoured the conventional genre of the love song, the cantiga de amor.

- Ai eu coitad'! e por que vi
- Ai eu coitado! e quand'acharei quem
- Ai eu! que mal dia naci
- Ai mia senhor e meu lum'e meu bem!
- Cuidava-m'eu que amigos havia
- De quantos mui coitados som
- Eu me cuidava, quando nom podia
- Mentre nom soube por mim mia senhor
- Meus amigos, direi-vos que m'avém
- Meus amigos, oimais quero dizer
- Moir'eu e praz-me, se Deus me perdom!
- Nom me poss'eu, mia senhor, defender
- Nostro Senhor! e por que mi fezestes
- Ora vej'eu que xe pode fazer
- Par Deus, senhor, já eu nom hei poder
- Pois contra vós nom me val, mia senhor
- Pola verdade que digo, senhor
- Por mui coitado per tenh'eu
- Qual dona Deus fez melhor parecer
- Quantos hoj'eu com amor sandeus sei
- Que alongad'eu ando d'u iria
- Que muit'há já que a terra nom vi
- Se Deus me valha, mia senhor
- Se eu a Deus algum mal mereci
- Se eu soubesse, u eu primeiro vi
- Senhor fremosa, pois vos vi
- Senhor fremosa, venho-vos dizer
- Senhor, per vós sõo maravilhado
- Senhor, queixo-me com pesar

=== Cantigas de escárnio e maldizer ===
After the love song, Pero favoured the satire most, the cantiga de escárnio e maldizer. His targets are many and varied, including fellow trovador Rui Queimado and the court dancers María Negra and María Pérez Balteira.

- D'ũa cousa sõo maravilhado
- Dom Fernando, pero mi maldigades
- Dona Maria Negra, bem talhada
- Fernam Díaz, este que and'aqui
- Fernand'Escalho leixei mal doente
- Fernand'Escalho vi eu cantar bem
- Já eu nom hei oimais por que temer
- Mais de mil vezes cuid'eu eno dia
- Maria Balteira, porque jogades
- Maria Negra des[a]ventuirada!
- Maria Negra vi eu, em outro dia
- Nostro Senhor, que bem alberguei
- Nunca Deus quis nulha cousa gram bem
- Pero me vós, donzela, mal queredes
- Que muito mi de Fernam Diaz praz
- Roi Queimado morreu com amor

=== Tençãos ===
Of Peros' two debate poems (tençãos), one is addressed to an anonymous whom Pero addresses as senhor (lord). It has been suggested that the anonymous interlocutor was Alfonso X.

- Quero que julguedes, Pero Garcia, with Lourenço
- Senhor, eu quer'ora de vós saber, with anonymous (possibly Alfonso X)

=== Uncertain genre ===
- Ai Deus! Que grave coita de sofrer
- Joana, dix'eu, Sancha e Maria
- Ora vej'eu que fiz mui gram folia
- Que muitos [os] que mi andam preguntando

== Bibliography ==
- Penafiel, André Barros (2016). The Emergence of the Cantigas d'Amor: A Philological Investigation of Poets, Genres, Manuscripts and their Compilers (PhD dissertation). University of Oxford.
- Kurtz, William S. (2018). "Dating cantigas". Virtual Center for the Study of Galician-Portuguese Lyric.
- Vallín Blanco, Gema (2022). "Pero García Burgalés". Diccionario biográfico español. Real Academia de la Historia.
