= Sexual ritual =

Psychologic and sociologic aspects of sex

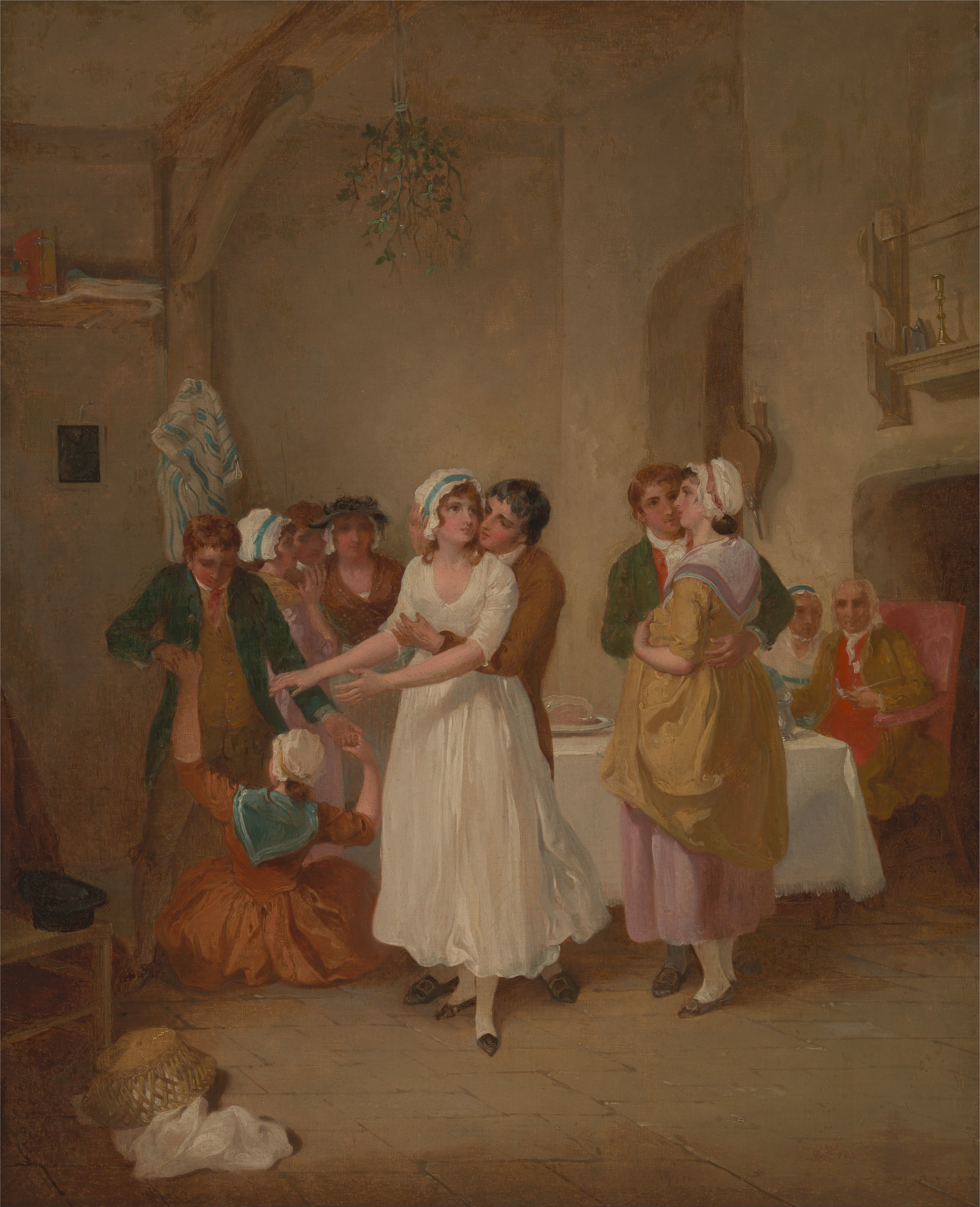
Kissing under the mistletoe as a surviving ritual

Sexual rituals fall into two categories: culture-created, and natural behaviour, the human animal having developed sex rituals from evolutionary instincts for reproduction, which are then integrated into society, and elaborated to include aspects such as marriage rites, dances, etc. Sometimes sexual rituals are highly formalized and/or part of religious activity, as in the cases of hieros gamos, the hierodule, and Ordo Templi Orientis (O.T.O.).

== Rites of passage ==
Part of the rites of passage of growing up are what have been termed "rites of separation from the asexual world... followed by rites of incorporation into the world of sexuality". These may be formal or semi-formal—"for some students, going to college is partly a sexual ritual, like the ceremonial dances of the whooping crane"—or take the form of a more private induction: "formal and artificial... the impression that a long-established rite was to be enacted, among Staffordshire figures and papier-mâché trays, with the compelling, detached formality of nightmare".

Freud was particularly interested in ethnological accounts of "the 'ceremonial' (purely formal, ritual, or official) coitus, which takes place" in connection with "the taboo of virginity".

=== Wedding as orgy ===
Freud also noted that in "numerous examples of marriage ceremonies, there can be no doubt that people other than the bridegroom, for example his assistants and companions (our traditional 'groomsmen'), were granted full sexual access to the bride". To his followers, "the wedding as orgy, with the bride taking on all the men present, is the clear historical reality behind the modern jokes... and the climactic line-up or 'gang'-kissing of the bride, by all the men present".

In such a view, "other examples of sacred or permitted public coitus of all women with all men do survive, in similarly modified 'kissing' form", as under the mistletoe "to revive the dying sun at the winter solstice, when the strongest human 'life-magic', namely ritual intercourse, is to be deployed".

== Interaction ritual ==
To the sociologist looking upon "sexual intercourse as interaction ritual... sexual intercourse is the ritual of love; it both creates and recreates the social tie (since Durkheimian rituals need to be repeated periodically, as solidarity runs down), and symbolizes it". In similar fashion, Margot Anand has pointed out that "rituals pervade our daily life and give it a sense of ceremony and celebration (...) a ritual, through your own unique symbolic gestures... will help you transform your lovemaking into a special and sacred act".

Erving Goffman has noted, however, "the considerable informational delicacy of this form of interaction", and how "individuals may use darkness to ensure strategic ambiguity".

== Compulsions ==
In perversion, sexual rituals may emerge as a necessary part of sexual activity. For the criminologist, "sexual ritual involves repeatedly engaging in an act or series of acts in a certain manner because of a sexual need". Within a relationship, "the Compulsive libido type takes advantages of opportunities to use the specific sexual ritual that causes intense arousal, and in its stronger form, the Compulsive lover can only arouse using the sexual object or ritual". In any relationship, however, "a sexual habit that becomes routine or stylised... can lead to a sexual ritual", so that "if you don't have a way to talk to your partner about your sexual relationship, you may find yourself... stuck in sexual rituals that could be limiting your sexual enjoyment": as a wife might say, "Same old technique, same old Lewis. It's you all right, I'd know that old routine anywhere." Thus one's sex life may all "be about rituals: the ritual of sex in the morning, or the ritual of sex at night; and the ritual of sex at anniversaries, and the ritual of sex at Christmas".

== Dharmic art ==
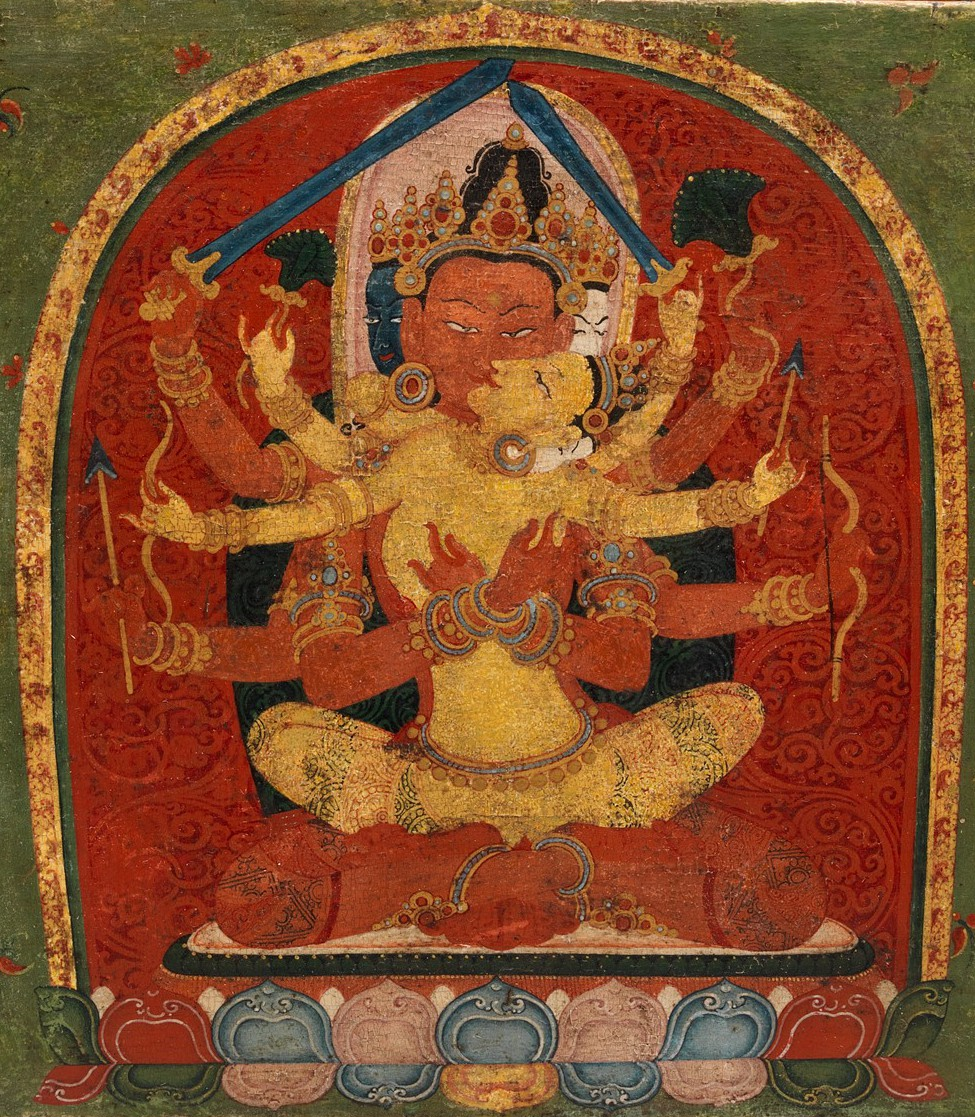
Tibetan book cover depicting Prajñāpāramitā Devi and Mañjuśrī in Yab-Yum, late 13th century

In the Buddhist art of India, Bhutan, Nepal and Tibet, yab-yum is the male deity in sexual union with his female consort. The symbolism is associated with Anuttarayoga tantra where the male figure is usually linked to compassion (karuṇā) and skillful means (upāya-kauśalya), and the female partner to 'insight' (prajñā). The symbolism of union and sexual polarity is a central teaching in Tantric Buddhism, especially in Tibet. The union is realised by the practitioner as a mystical experience within one's own body. Yab-yum is generally understood to represent the primordial (or mystical) union of wisdom and compassion. Tantric Buddhism is itself an outcrop of Tantrism, advanced techniques of which included "the ritual sex act (Maithuna) which was a feature of Tantric yoga". Given that "sex is holy to a Tantric... Tantric art, writings and religious rituals glorify sex".

== Private worship ==
A sex organ "makes an admirable fertility symbol, and has been worshipped as such privately from time to time, or even publicly... gives dramatic promise of productivity and protection". Such "worship" may only become more common in late modernity, as "in our secular culture, sexuality often replaces religion as a means of pursuing the meaning of life". Alan Watts maintains that "when you are in love with someone, you do indeed see them as a divine being... through a tremendous outpouring of psychic energy in total devotion and worship for this other person". A woman may 'want someone who adores me... like he was adoring my breasts with his hands". A man (more ambivalently) may muse on "the white breasts he worships; adores; is scared of; detests". For Shakespeare, "this is the liver-vein, which makes flesh a deity, a green goose a goddess; pure, pure idolatry".

In the further reaches of chick lit, "the male organ... becomes a tower of strength, a tree trunk in girth, the pillar that sustains the universe... a Pillar of Hercules, sustaining heaven"—evidence perhaps that "the phallic religious tendency is alive in the modern and the civilized... a compulsive fascination" with what Jung termed "the phallus as the quintessence of life and fruitfulness". Correspondingly, the Western adept may borrow, in the quest "to create a Sacred Space... names given to the vagina in the East, including Valley of Joy, Great Jewel, Pearl, Lotus Blossom, Moist Cave, Ripe Peach, Enchanted Garden, and Full Moon".

== Literature ==
In the Satyricon, the hero is throughout "hounded by the mighty rage of Priapus of Hellespont"—almost certainly because early on, he "has offended Priapus... by impersonating him in some sexual ceremonies".

== See also ==
- Ambubachi Mela
- Courtship
- Dating
- Lingam
- Marriage
- Maypole
- Neotantra
- Sacred prostitution
- Sex magic
- Tantric sex
- Yoni worship
