= Padre Putas =

Catholic cleric caring for prostitutes in Salamanca, Spain

Padre Putas (English: father of whores) was a cleric responsible for monitoring and giving care to prostitutes in Salamanca, during the Spanish Golden Age.

== Origins ==
In the 16th century, the University of Salamanca was the most important study centre in Spain, having nearly 7,000 students, so the demand for prostitutes was high. As a great variety of literary and historical sources of the time attest, the Casa de la Mancebía was one of the most flourishing red-light districts in Spain during the Golden Age.

Prince John, son of Ferdinand and Isabella, lived in Salamanca during his tutoring by Bishop Diego de Deza. With the bishop's agreement, organised the prostitutes of Salamanca to locate to the Casa de la Mancebía, where they should be under the supervision of a priest, who became known as the Padre Putas (father of whores). Padre Putas was also responsible for the welfare of the prostitutes, ensuring that they had food and the services of apothecaries and surgeons. He was also responsible for the prostitutes abstaining from work on Holy days and feast days. The appointment of a Padre Putas had to be approved by the Consistory, and he had to swear an oath of office before a notary.

== Monday of Waters ==
The future King Philip II came to Salamanca for his marriage to Maria Manuela, Princess of Portugal in 1543. He was concerned about the number of prostitutes in the city and issued an edict that prostitutes should leave the city's Casa de la Mancebía during the period of annual abstinence (Lent, Holy Week and Easter). They were to be inactive and remain outside the city walls on the left bank of the river during this period. On the afternoon of the Monday after Easter, led by Padre Putas (one of the most coveted official positions of the time), they returned to the city, crossing the river in boats that the students had decorated. This annual custom became so popular that a large part of the city's inhabitants came to observe it and take part in the celebrations. This tradition is still celebrated in the city as the Monday of Waters.

== Modern Day ==
Although the festival of Monday of Waters no longer marks the returning of the prostitutes, the celebrations still continue today. Padre Putas is one of the characters portrayed during the event, being one of the costumed figures in the Gigantes y cabezudos (English: Giant and big-headed) parade.

The La Plataforma Abolicionista de Salamanca staged a protest against the Monday of Waters celebrations in 2019, hanging figures representing "the pimp" Padre Putas and "other rapists" from the Enrique Estevan bridge.

He is remembered in the name of a restaurant in Salamanca.

== Bibliography ==
- Gómez, Miguel Casas (1986). La interdicción lingüística: mecanismos del eufemismo y disfemismo [Linguistic interdiction: mechanisms of euphemism and dysphemism] (in Spanish). Servicio de Publicaciones, Universidad de Cádiz. ISBN 9788460045915.
- Gratchev, Slav N.; Mancing, Howard (2018). Mikhail Bakhtin's Heritage in Literature, Arts, and Psychology: Art and Answerability. Rowman & Littlefield. ISBN 978-1-4985-8270-4.
- Guereña, Jean-Louis (2003). La prostitución en la España contemporánea [Prostitution in contemporary Spain] (in Spanish). Marcial Pons Historia. ISBN 978-84-95379-62-7.
- Ray, Michael, ed. (2013). Portugal and Spain. Britannica Educational Publishing. ISBN 978-1-61530-993-1.
