= Temple of Atargatis =

Coordinates: 34.746918°N 40.73105°E

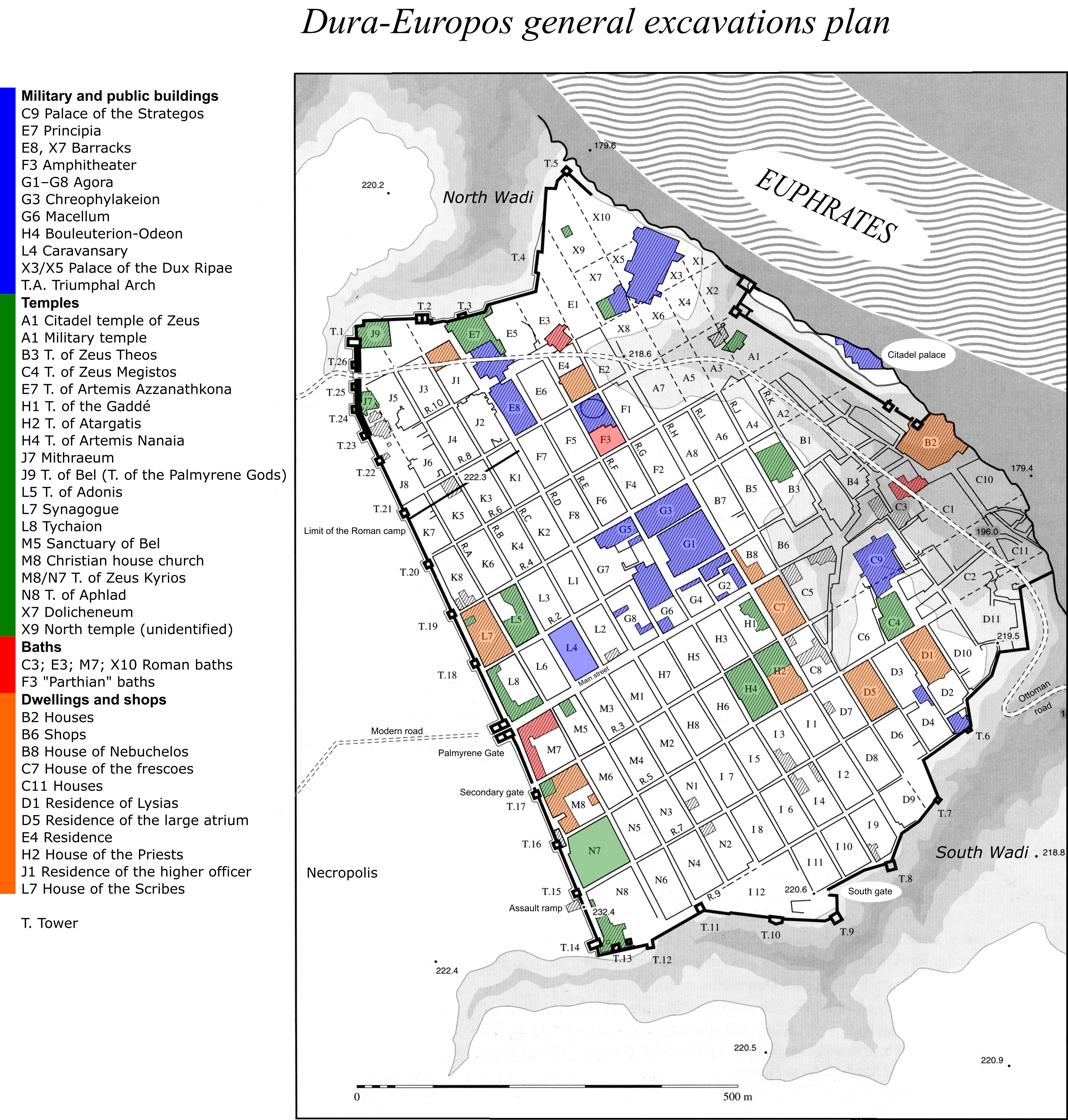
Dura-Europos general excavations plan, Temple of Atargatis is marked as H2

The temple photographed in 1929-1930

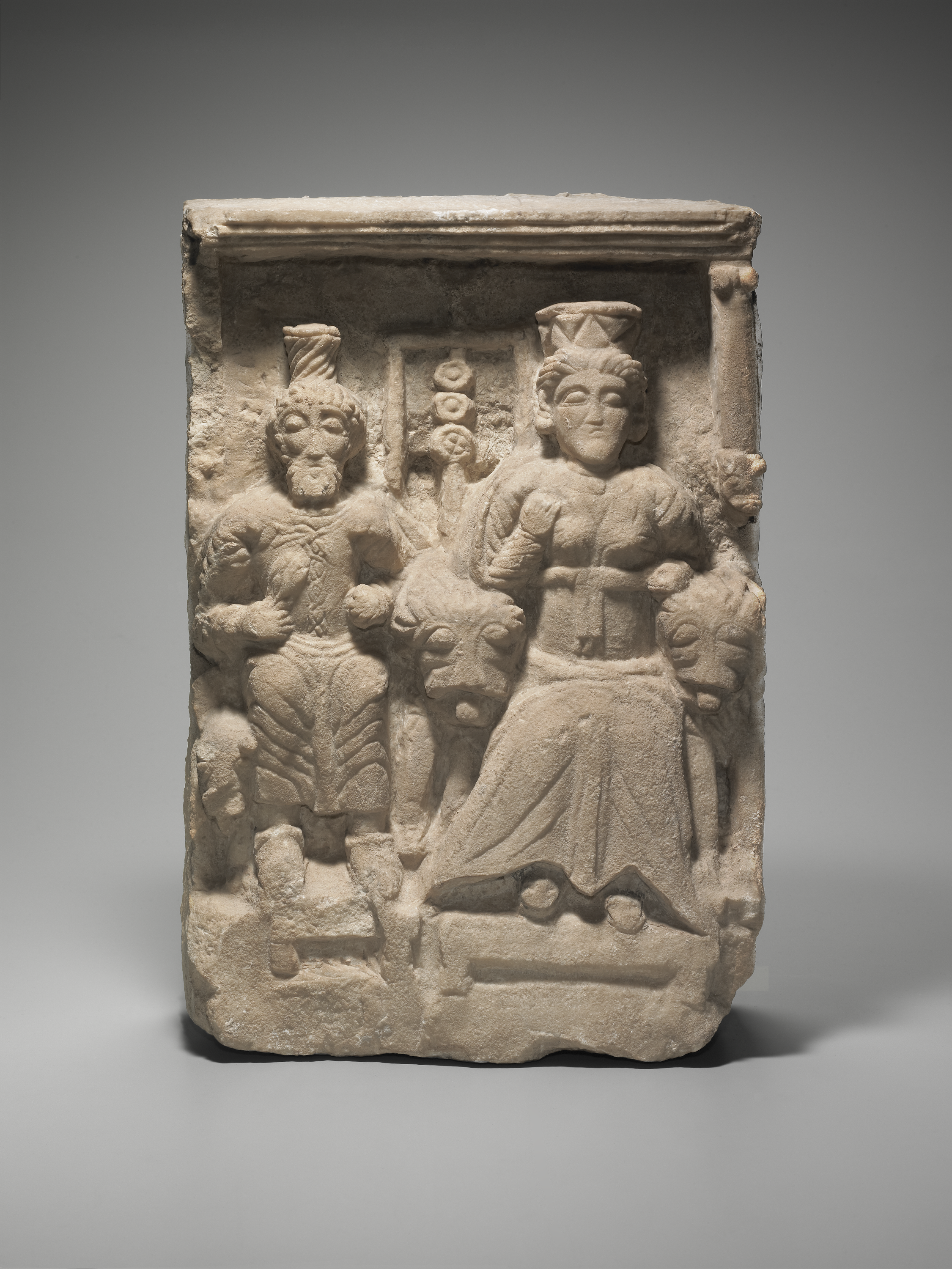
Relief from the Temple of Atargatis

The Temple of Atargatis in Dura-Europos was one of the main temples of the city. The temple was built in the first century AD, when the city was under Parthian rule, and excavated in 1928–1929 under the direction of Maurice Pillet.

A relief from the sanctuary of the temple shows the goddess Atargatis, with lions by both sides, accompanied by her husband Hadad. A cult standard is depicted between the two deities, above the lion on the left. It is perhaps the main cult image in the temple. Atargatis was believed to be the mother of Adonis. Hadad and Adonis could also be worshipped here.

== Location and proximity to the temple of Artemis ==
The temple is located south of the center (referred to by the excavators as the agora) of the city and occupies the northeastern part of the H2 block. The Temple used to share a wall with the building occupying the southeast corner of block H2, which is believed to have been the living space for the priests. These speculations have resulted in the adjoining building being named the House of Priests. The alley that runs between the Temple and the House is believed to have supported an upper floor connecting the two buildings, and a barricaded doorway has been found between the two buildings, implying that the residents were affiliated with the Temple. The cult building is close to the temple of Artemis in Dura-Europos. The temple has a courtyard with a monumental entrance and three sanctuaries on the back wall as well as a pronaos in front of it. There were also remains of wall paintings. There are various rooms around the courtyard, some of them with benches along the walls. Some of these rooms could have served as chapels for other deities, while other rooms were dining rooms for the cult community.

== Cult image of Atargatis and her husband Hadad ==
A relief from the sanctuary of the temple shows the goddess Atargatis, with lions by both sides, accompanied by her husband Hadad. A cult standard is depicted between the two deities, above the lion on the left. It is perhaps the main cult image in the temple. Atargatis was believed to be the mother of Adonis. Hadad and Adonis could also be worshipped here.

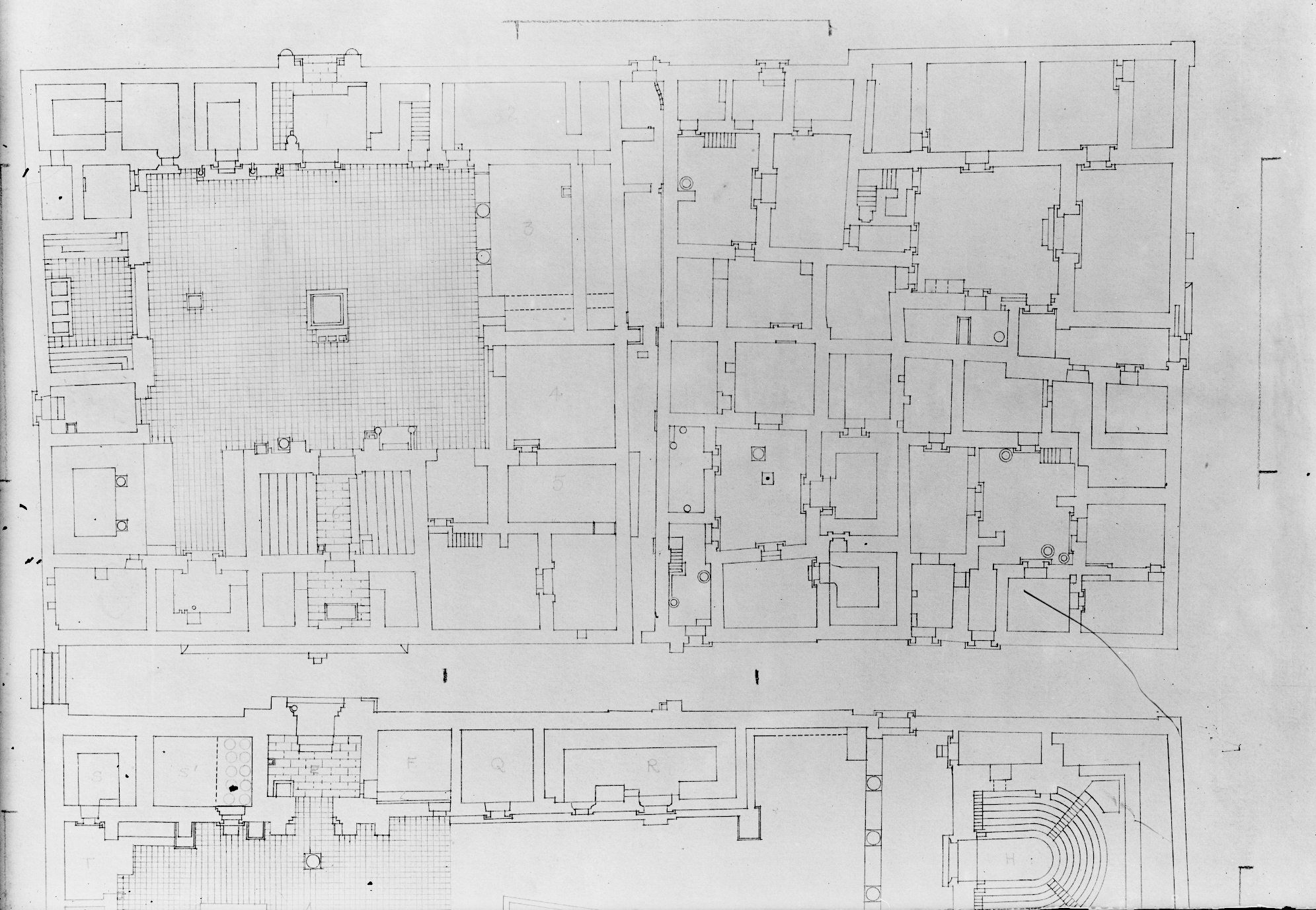
Plan of the temple of Atargatis

== Inscriptions ==
Various inscriptions tell of the people who visited the sanctuary; the temple was frequented by people from Hatra. A visitor's inscription in Hatrene Aramaic is addressed to the god Šamaš, the main god of this city. In the temple were discovered inscriptions dedicated to other gods such as Sin, Sasados and Saddoudan. The majority of the epigraphic material is in Greek, while 2 texts are written in different dialects and scripts of Aramaic - Syriac alphabet and mentioned before Hatran Aramaic. A striking number of inscriptions (more than 30) in the temple, some of which were scratched on the seats in a stepped room, were made for women. There is an inscription from the first half of the first century AD that mentions the consecration of a room. A number of other inscriptions date from AD 61/62. Some of the women named in the inscriptions appear to have come from the family of the governors of Dura-Europos. One woman was the granddaughter of the governor Lysias, another woman the wife of the governor Seleucus.

== Old Babylonian script ==
In the walls of the temple there was found a cuneiform tablet with the Old Babylonian script, which names the place Da-wa-ra. This can be an old name for Dura.
