= Wandering miko =

Historical Japanese Shinto priestess

Wandering Miko Aruki Miko (歩き巫女) are a historical variety of miko, or Shinto priestesses, from Japan. Wandering miko are characterised by their lack of allegiance to any particular shrine or temple, instead performing their religious duties in various locations over time.

Gehōbako were a common tool among wandering miko.

== Overview ==
While not belonging to specific Shinto shrines, wandering Miko made their living by traveling around the country praying, ordaining, and advocating. Similarly, some wandering miko also worked as itinerant poets and prostitutes. For this reason, they could also be called shirayumoji (白湯文字, an ordinary woman who secretly engages in sex work), or tabi-jo-rо̄ (旅女郎, a prostitute who travels alone on foot to meet various clients). Other terms included azusa miko (a priestess who performed rites by playing a bowstring) or kumano higauni (a priestess who spread the Kumano faith throughout Japan).

Other varieties of wandering miko including the waka (若, priestesses who served "offshoot" shrines known as wakamiya), agata (miko who traveled rural areas), shirayama-miko (a miko of the shirayama faith), and moriko (the wife of a yamabushi) are all said to have carried their gods with them and traveled from place to place to perform rituals such as the kamado harahi and to act as mediums.

== Shinano miko ==
Shinano miko were wandering miko who left present-day Tōmi City, Nagano Prefecture and wandered throughout Japan performing their duties. There have been claims that Mochizuki Chiyome trained such miko during the Sengoku period to be used for gathering information for the Takeda clan of Kai Province. Such women are sometimes referred to as kunoichi, a type of female ninja.

=== Origins ===
Kunio Yanagita claims these miko were originally miko of the Suwa Shrine and called nonō (originating from their call or a reference to religious texts), and traveled the country as preachers of the Suwa faith.

=== Transition to prostitution ===
As mikos' passion for the kami waned, miko communities grew near the village of Nezu, and, again according to Yanagita, these miko again began to wander Japan afterwards as mediums capable of speaking for the dead. These miko were known by many names across many regions, manchi or mannichi (originating from the term mannihyo), nonō, tabi-niro (in Niigata), iinawa or iitsuna (in Kyoto Prefecture), kongarasama (in Okayama Prefecture, because their dance resembled whirligig beetles, called kongara), oshihe, tojibanashi (in Shimane Prefecture), naoshi (in Hiroshima Prefecture), toride (in Kumamoto Prefecture), kitsunetsuke (in Saga Prefecture), and yakamishu (on Nii-jima in the Izu Islands). They were beautiful women ranging in age from seventeen and eighteen to their thirties and made appearances in various regions from Kanto to Kinki, and were said to have gone around calling, "Would you like to speak to a shrine maiden?" They carried on their backs a small box called a gehōbako wrapped in a navy blue furoshiki (wrapping cloth) sewn into a boat shape, with white spats under a white undergarment called a juban, and then a white wrap skirt, koshimaki, hanging from the hips. They traveled in groups of two or three, acting as mediums, praying, and selling sex. Their appearance led to them being called shiroyumoji, literally "white underskirt", in Yamanashi and Wakayama prefectures.

The miko may conduct a ritual by casting water on the gehōbako with dried leaves then lowering her head. It was not certain which kami resided in each box, but one account states a box contained a six-inch statue of kukunouchi (a scarecrow with a bow), a wooden kiboko statue (a carving of a conjoined man and woman), a nearly two-inch Buddha, a dried cat head, the skull of a white dog, a hina-ningyō doll, and a straw effigy.

A miko would depart Nonō Koji in Old Nishi-Machi of Nezu village between the lunar new year and the fourth month, travel the country to work, then return by the next lunar new year's eve. Upon return, she would undergo kongori, a ritual of purification in cold water.

During her pilgrimage, the head of each miko village, called Kakae-nushi or Boppoku, would recruit beautiful girls between the ages of 8 and 16 from across the country (from Kanto to Kishu, primarily from Mino and Hida) either for an agreed number of years or as adopted daughters. These girls were brought back to Shinshu to be trained by a senior nonō for three to five years before becoming a full-fledged miko. Locals welcomed the miko when they came, even if they brought only a few things or their own personal belongings with them. It was even said a Shinano priestess was as rich as 1,000 people combined, accompanied by an attendant simply for carrying her luggage, and able to travel between regions without a certificate. This was of course because they spent their money generously as they engaged material pleasures, though they always repaid their debts where they traveled and abstained from eating meat, as they were religious figures.

They traveled to Kantō (Hinohara village) and Kansai (near Kawachinagano City and Katsuragi Village) until the early Meiji era.

== Bibliography ==
- Taro Nakayama, "History of Japanese Shrine Maidens
- Kunio Yanagita, "Miko Ko", in "Teibon Kunio Yanagita Shu Vol. 9".
- Ichiro Hori, A Study of the History of Beliefs among My People.
- Ken'ichi Tanigawa, "Ijin no Ijin to Geijutsu (Different Gods and Performing Arts of the Lowly)," Iwanami Shoten
- Ishikawa, Yoshikazu, "Shinano no Arukushimiko: The Real Image of Nonou, a Walking Miko in the Village of Nezu," Green Art Publishing Co.
