= List of Galician-Portuguese troubadours =

This is a list of composers (troubadours, Galician: trobadores, Portuguese: trovadores) and minstrels of the Galician-Portuguese lyric.

== A ==
- Abril Peres
- Afonso Anes do Cotom
- Afonso Fernandes Cebolhilha
- Afonso Fernandes Cubel
- Afonso Gomes
- Afonso Lopes de Baião
- Afonso Mendes de Besteiros
- Afonso Pais de Braga
- Afonso Sanches
- Afonso Soares Sarraça
- King Alfonso X of Castile
- King Alfonso XI of Castile
- Airas Carpancho
- Airas Engeitado
- Airas Moniz de Asma
- Airas Nunes
- Airas Pais
- Airas Peres Vuitorom
- Airas Soares
- Airas Veaz
- Alvaro Afonso
- Arnaut Catalan

== B ==
- Bernal de Bonaval
- Bonifaci Calvo

== C ==
- Caldeirom

== D ==
- King Denis of Portugal
- Dom Juano
- Diego Pezelho
- Diogo Gonçalves de Montemor-o-Novo
- Diogo Moniz

== E ==
- Estevão Coelho
- Estêvão da Guarda
- Estêvão Faião
- Estêvão Fernandes Barreto
- Estêvão Fernandes d'Elvas
- Estêvão Peres Froião
- Estêvão Reimondo
- Estêvão Travanca

== F ==
- Fernando Eanes
- Fernando Esquio
- Fernão do Lago
- Fernão Fernandes Cogominho
- Fernão Figueira de Lemos
- Fernão Froiaz
- Fernão Garcia Esgaravunha
- Fernão Gonçalves de Seabra
- Fernão Padrom
- Fernão Pais de Tamalhancos
- Fernão Rodrigues de Calheiros
- Fernão Rodrigues Redondo
- Fernão Soares de Quinhones
- Fernão Velho

== G ==
- Galisteu Fernandes
- Garcia Martins
- Garcia Mendes de Eixo
- Garcia Peres
- Garcia Soares
- Gil Peres Conde
- Gil Sanches
- Golparro
- Gomes Garcia
- Gonçalo Anes do Vinhal
- Gonçalo Garcia

== J ==
- João
- João Airas de Santiago
- João Baveca
- João de Cangas
- João de Gaia
- João de Requeixo
- João Fernandes de Ardeleiro
- João Garcia
- João Garcia de Guilhade
- João Lobeira
- João Lopes de Ulhoa
- João Mendes de Briteiros
- João Nunes Camanês
- João Peres de Aboim
- João Romeu de Lugo
- João Servando
- João Soares Coelho
- João Soares de Paiva
- João Soares Somesso
- João Vasques de Talaveira
- João Velaz
- João Velho de Pedrogães
- João Zorro
- Josepe
- Juião Bolseiro

== L ==
- Lopo
- Lopo Lias
- Lourenço

== M ==
- Macías
- María Pérez Balteira
- Martim
- Martim Anes Marinho
- Martim Campina
- Martim Codax
- Martim de Caldas
- Martim de Ginzo
- Martim Moxa
- Martim Padrozelos
- Martim Peres Alvim
- Martim Soares
- Mem Pais
- Mem Rodrigues de Briteiros
- Mem Rodrigues Tenoiro
- Mem Vasques de Folhente
- Mendinho
- Múnio Fernandes de Mirapeixe

== N ==
- Nunes
- Nuno Anes Cerzeo
- Nuno Fernandes Torneol
- Nuno Peres Sandeu
- Nuno Porco
- Nuno Rodrigues de Candarei
- Nuno Trez

== O ==
- Osoiro Anes

== P ==
- Paio Calvo
- Paio de Cana
- Paio Gomes Charinho
- Paio Soares de Taveirós
- Palla
- Pedro Amigo de Sevilha
- Pedro Anes Solaz
- Pero Anes Marinho
- Pero da Ponte
- Pero de Armea
- Pedro de Barcelos
- Pero de Berdia
- Pero de Ver
- Pero Dornelas
- Pero Garcia Burgalês
- Pero Garcia de Ambroa
- Pero Gomes Barroso
- Pero Gonçalves de Portocarreiro
- Pero Guterres
- Pero Larouco
- Pero Mafaldo
- Pero Martins
- Pero Mendes da Fonseca
- Pero Meogo
- Pero Pais Bazaco
- Pero Rodrigues de Palmeira
- Pero Velho de Taveirós
- Pero Viviães
- Picandom

== R ==
- Raimbaut de Vaqueiras
- Reimon Gonçalves
- Rodrigo Anes de Alvares
- Rodrigo Anes de Vasconcelos
- Rodrigo Anes Redondo
- Rui Dias de los Cameros
- Rui Fernandes de Santiago
- Rui Gomes de Briteiros
- Rui Gomes o Freire
- Rui Martins de Ulveira
- Rui Martins do Casal
- Rui Pais de Ribela
- Rui Queimado
- Rui Tonso Cantom

== S ==
- King Sancho I of Portugal
- Sancho Sanches

== V ==
- Vasco Gil
- Vasco Martins de Resende
- Vasco Peres Pardal
- Vasco Praga de Sandim
- Vasco Rodrigues de Calvelo
- Vidal

== Anonymous ==
- Anonymous author of the Lais de Bretanha
- Anonymous author of Senhor fremosa, pois me vej'aqui
- Anonymous Senhor of a tenção with Pero Garcia Burgalês
- Anónimo de Santarém

== See also ==
- List of troubadours and trobairitz
- List of Minnesänger
- List of trouvères
