= Airas Carpancho =

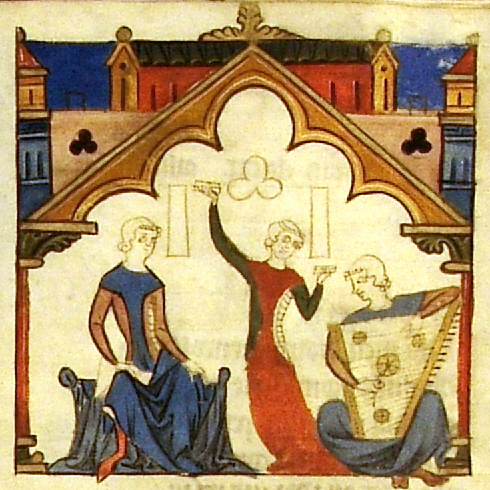
Miniature accompanying Airas' Quisera-m'ir: tal conselho prendi in the Cancioneiro da Ajuda

Airas Fernandes (c. 1170 – c. 1240), called Carpancho, was a knight and trobador from Galicia.

== Life ==
The main sources for Carpancho's life are four documents in the Tumbo C cartulary from the archives of the cathedral of Santiago de Compostela. The Latin form of his name as it appears in documents is Arias Femandi, dictus Carpanchus. In a reconstructed genealogy, he was the son of Fernando Pais, son of Paio Peres, son of Pedro Gelmires, brother of the Archbishop Diego Gelmires. His brothers were Adão, Nuno and Pedro. The family was closely linked to the cathedral. Adão and Nuno studied in Paris.

In 1230, Carpancho renounced his part in the benefices of San Vicente de Alón, San Vicente de Aguas Santas and Santa María de Isorna in favour of the cathedral. In 1237, he made out his will, leaving property at Rubians to the monastery of San Paio de Antealtares.

== Works ==
Carpancho wrote the following cantigas de amigo (female-voiced love poems):

- A maior coita que eu no mund'hei
- Chegades, amiga, d'u é meu amigo
- Madre velida, meu amigo vi
- Madre, pois vós desamor havedes
- Molher com'eu nom vive, coitada
- Por fazer romaria pug'em meu coraçom
- Que me mandades, ai madre, fazer
- Tanto sei eu de mi parte quant'é de meu coraçom

All of these have been translated into English by Rip Cohen. The first stanza of Madre, pois vós desamor havedes in English reads:

Mother, since you feel hatred
For my boyfriend, because you know
That he loves me, I shall see him,
And, mother, if you love me at all,
You will praise me, that I know.

He also wrote the following cantigas de amor:

- Ai Deus! com'ando coitado d'amor!
- Ai Deus! que coita de sofrer
- Desej'eu muit'a veer mia senhor
- Pois que se nom sente a mia senhor
- Quisera-m'ir: tal conselho prendi

== Bibliography ==
- Cohen, Rip (2012). "Angelo Colocci's Crosses and a Text of Airas Carpancho". In João Dionísio (ed.). Private: do (not) enter: Personal Writings and Textual Scholarship. Brill. pp. 169–181. doi:10.1163/9789401207546_015.
- Cohen, Rip, ed. (2010). The Cantigas d'Amigo: An English Translation. JScholarship.
- Souto Cabo, José António; Frateschi Vieira, Yara (2004). "Para um novo enquadramento histórico-literário de Airas Fernandes, dito «Carpancho»"" (PDF). Revista de Literatura medieval. 16 (1).
- Souto Cabo, José António (2022). "Fernandes, Airas". Diccionario Biográfico Español. Real Academia de la Historia.
