= Vidal (troubadour) =

Vidal was a Portuguese Jewish troubadour from Elvas who wrote Galician-Portuguese lyrics. Yara Vieira has argued that he was probably a physician. He was active in the period 1320–1340. He is one of two known Jewish troubadours in Galician-Portuguese, the other being Josep.

Two of Vidal's songs are known, both cantigas de amor (love songs) and both found together in cancioneiros (songbooks) B and V:

- Faz-m'agora por si morrer
- Moir, e faço dereito

The poems are introduced by a famous rubric, which has been attributed to Count Pedro de Barcelos. The author feels it necessary to clarify that Vidal was in love with a Jewish woman, since sexual relations between a Jewish man and a Christian woman were illegal:

Estas duas cantigas fez hũu judeu d'Elvas que avia nome Vidal, por amor d'ũa judia de ssa vila que avia nome Dona. E por que é ben que o ben que home faz sse non perça, mandamolo screver; e non sabemos mais dela[s] mais de duas cobras, a primeira cobra de cada hũa.

Translation:

These two songs were made by a Jew of Elvas whose name was Vidal, for the love of a Jewess whose name was Dona. And since it is only right that the good that a man does not be lost, we have ordered them copied; and we know no more of them than two strophes, the first strophe of each one.

The strophic form of the poems and their rhyme schemes have been analysed in different ways colometrically. In any case, the poems are unusual. Whereas Luciana Stegagno Picchio gives the poems uniquely long strophes of ten or twelve lines, Rip Cohen finds a more standard structure but with internal rhyme, which is rarely found in the cantiga de amor genre. It is very similar to a popular form of Andalusi zajal.

According to Cohen, Vidal "lived on a geographic and cultural frontier, far from the poets at court, and probably knew both Andalusi Arabic and Hebrew love poetry." Vieira argues, however, that many attempts to find exoticism in Vidal's verses are misplaced. Most of his more unusual similes and images have parallels in Galician-Portuguese in literature. The distinguishing mark of his poetry is that it is in the language of the dominant culture rather than Hebrew.
