= João Nunes Camanês =

Miniature at the start of João's songs in the Cancioneiro da Ajuda

João Nunes Camanês (or Joam Nunes Camanez) was a Galician-Portuguese troubadour. His surname suggests that he was from Camán, a populated place in the parish of Albeos, Galicia. He wrote five cantigas de amigo, love songs written in the female voice:

- Id', ai mia madre, vee'lo meu amigo
- Par Deus, amigo, muit'há gram sazom
- Par Deus, donas, quando veer
- Se eu, mia filha, for
- Vistes, filha, noutro dia

Id', ai mia madre, vee'lo meu amigo ("Go, ah, my mother, to see my beloved") and Se eu, mia filha, for ("If I, my daughter, go") have been translated into English. In the first, a girl asks her mother to go see her friend who is in love with her, each of three stanzas ending "and I will go with you, if you wish." In the second, the mother is planning to see the friend who is dying of love. The refrain is "will you go together with me? / By God, my mother, I will."

He also wrote three cantigas de amor, conventional love songs:

- De vós, senhor, querria eu saber
- Nom me queredes, mia senhor
- Rogaria eu mia senhor
