= Airas =

Airas may refer to

- Airas Nunes, 13th century Galician cleric and troubador
- Johan Airas de Santiago, 13th century Galician troubador
