= Cantiga =

Medieval monophonic song

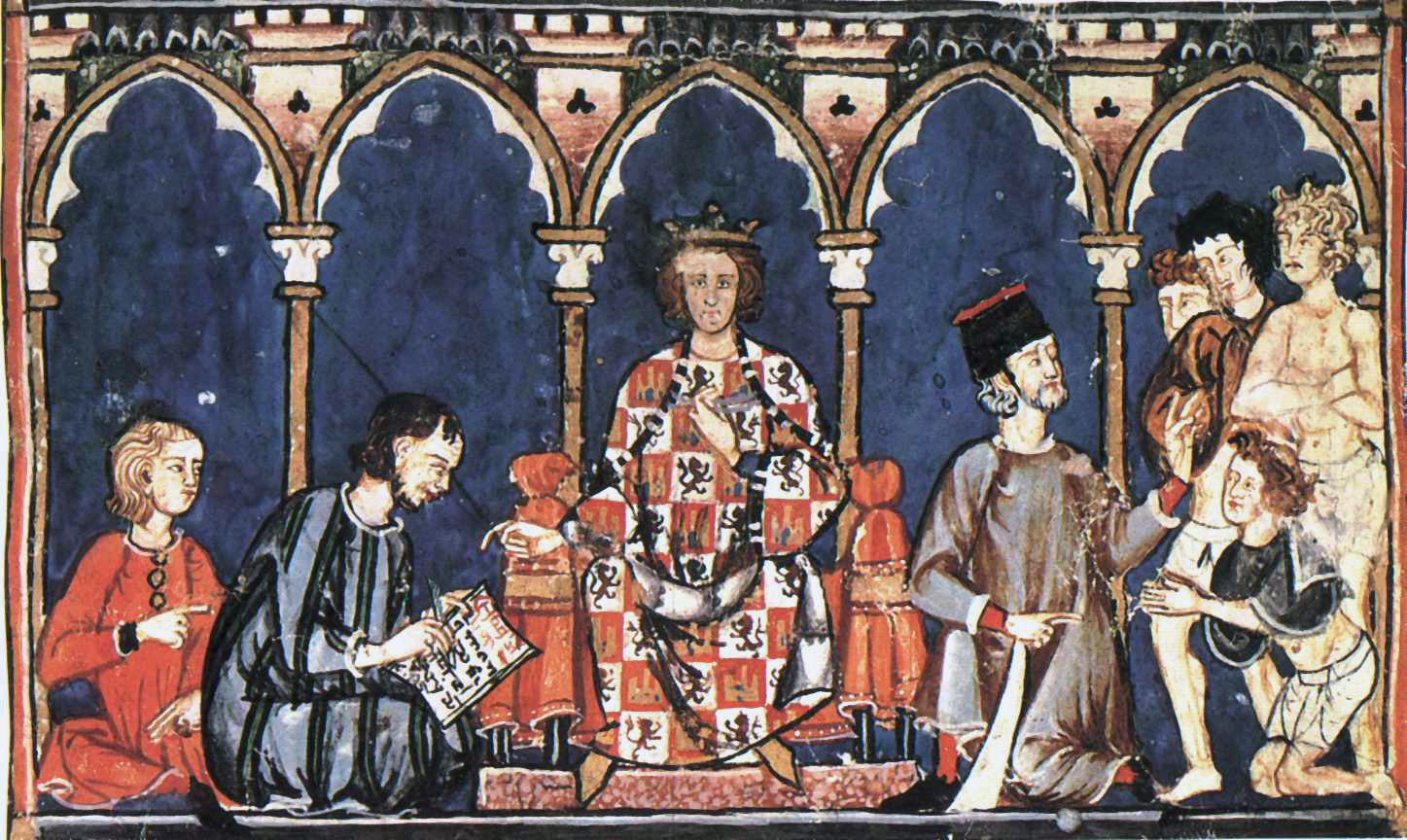
Alfonso X the Wise and the King of Castile and León (in present-day Spain)

A cantiga (cantica, cantar) is a medieval monophonic song, characteristic of the Galician-Portuguese lyric. Over 400 extant cantigas come from the Cantigas de Santa Maria, narrative songs about miracles or hymns in praise of the Holy Virgin. There are near 1700 secular cantigas but music has only survived for a very few: six cantigas de amigo by Martín Codax and seven cantigas de amor by Denis of Portugal.

Cantiga is also the name of a poetic and musical form of the Renaissance, often associated with the villancico and the canción.

== See also ==
- Pergaminho Sharrer
- Pergaminho Vindel
