= Bernal de Bonaval =

13th-century poet

Bernal(do) de Bonaval(le)
- Born: Santiago de Compostela
- Died: Unknown
- Other names: Bernardo (de) Bonaval
- Occupation: Troubadour
- Years active: 13th century
- Notable work: "A dona que eu amo"

Bernal(do) de Bonaval(le), also known as Bernardo (de) Bonaval, was a 13th-century poet in the Kingdom of Galicia (in the northwest of the Iberian Peninsula, in parts of modern Portugal and Spain) who wrote in the Galician-Portuguese language.

== Biography ==
Little is known for certain about Bernal's background, life, or career.

Sources say that he was a native of Santiago de Compostela, which is in the modern Galicia (Spain). He mentions a place called "Bonaval" in several of his poems. It has been suggested that he was born outside the mediaeval city walls of Santiago, because "de Bonaval" may refer to the Convent of San Domingos de Bonaval, which is outside those walls. It has also been suggested that "Bernal de Bonaval" and (in Latin) "Frater Bernardus, prior Bone Uallis" ("Brother Bernardus, prior of Bone Uallis") may have been one and the same. If that suggestion is correct, then Bernal may have been a friar in the Dominican Order, and "de Bonaval" may refer to the convent rather than to his birthplace.

He was active in the 13th century. Some sources suggest that he may have been born in the 12th century. He was known at the courts of Fernando III and Alfonso X (kings of Galicia 1231-1252 and 1252-1284 respectively).

A poem of 1266 by King Alfonso X directed at the troubadour Pero da Ponte mentions Bernal: "Vós nom trobades come proençal, / mais come Bernaldo de Bonaval; / por ende nom é trobar natural / pois que o del e do dem'aprendestes" ("You do not compose like a Provençal / but like Bernaldo de Bonaval / and therefore your poetry-making is not natural / for you learned it from him and from the [D]evil"). Bernal was also mentioned in verse by the troubadours Airas Peres Vuitoron, João Baveca and Pedro (Pero) da Ponte.

It has been suggested in recent times by one author that Bernal may have had a reputation as a passive homosexual, and may have been the same man as the one nicknamed "Bernal Fundado" (i.e. "Bernal the Split"). (Note: A modern claim that someone in mediaeval times was or may have been homosexual should perhaps be treated with caution unless there is convincing contemporary evidence. In those days, an accusation that a rival or enemy was guilty of the sin and crime of sodomy seems not to have been uncommon. For example, it was made in the 13th century during Bernal's lifetime against the Cathars in the Albigensian Crusade in the south of France.)

== Works ==
He is one of the earliest known xograres or segreis (Galician troubadours). Nineteen of his works have survived: ten cantigas de amor (on the theme of courtly love), eight cantigas de amigo, and one tensón. (Note: A tensón was a debate in verse between poets. Bernal's tensón was between him and Abril Pérez.) He introduced popular motifs and realistic features into what had been a scholastic form of poetry. He has been called "Villonesque", even though François Villon lived two centuries later.

His songs have been preserved in the Cancioneiro da Vaticana (CV 660) and the Cancioneiro da Biblioteca Nacional (CBN 1003).

== Legacy and critical reception ==
Rúa de Bernal de Bonaval (a street) in Santiago de Compostela is named after him. In 1961, Brazilian scholar Massaud Moisés ranked him among the principal troubadours. The 1971 album Cantigas de Amigos includes a duet between Portuguese artists Amália Rodrigues and Ary Dos Santos called "Vem esperar meu amigo". It is a version of Bernal's cantiga de amigo "Ai, fremosinha, se ben ajades", named from its refrain rather than from its first line. (Note: That source does not name the author of the original text which it quotes, but it is identical to that of Bernal's "Ai, fremosinha, se ben ajades".) Spanish musician Amancio Prada included his version of Bernal's "A dona que eu amo" on his 1984 album Leliadoura. In 1985, Portuguese scholar Ribeiro Miranda published an academic paper analysing Bernal's importance. In 1994, Galician writer Castelao named Bernal among the notable Galicians. In 2012, Galician scholar Souto Cabo called him "uma das personalides poéticas mais célebres dos nossos cancioneros" ("one of the most famous poets in our songbooks").
