= Mendinho =

Galician poet

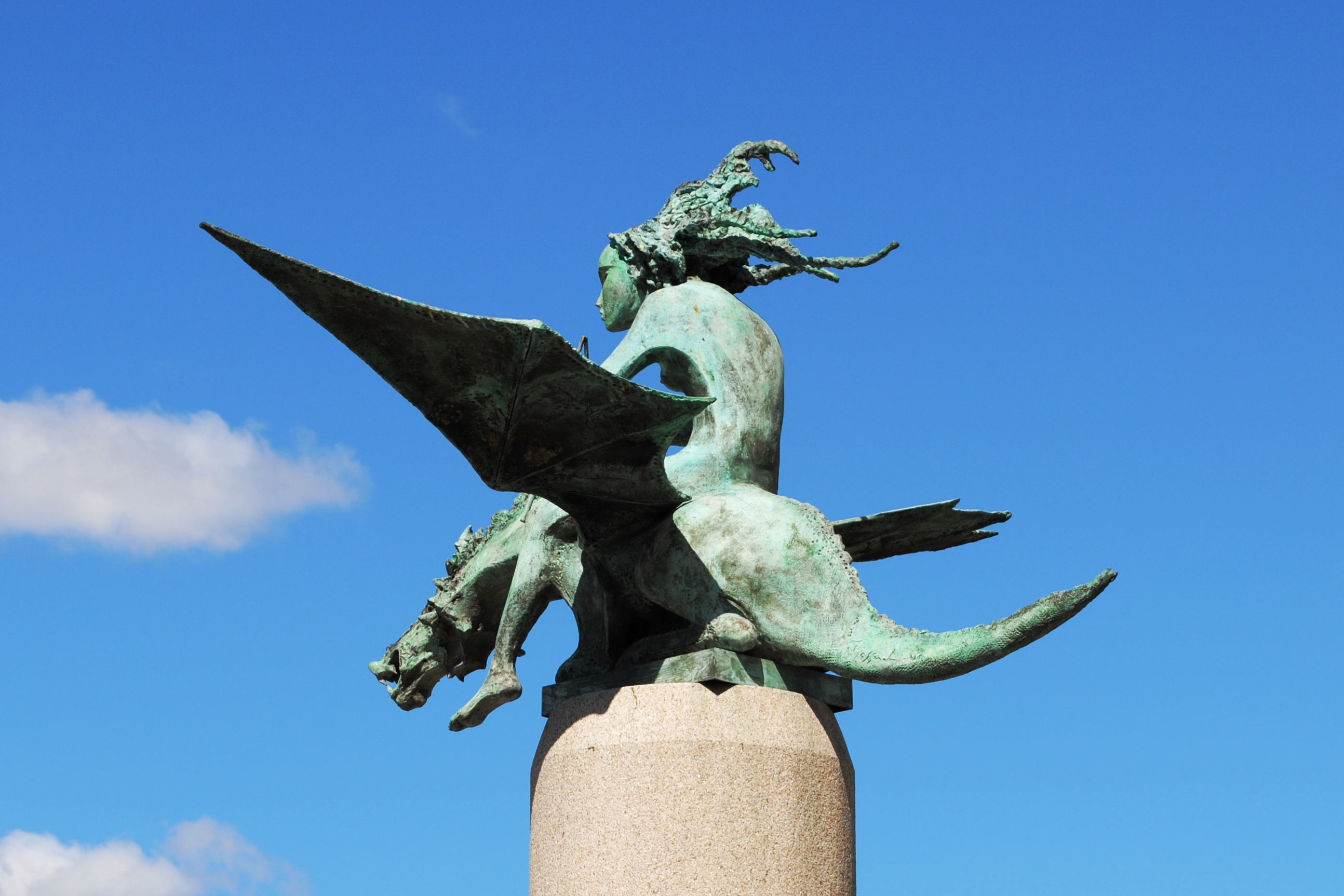
Paseo de Alfonso XII de Vigo: A fada e o dragón The sculpture, cast in bronze, represents a nymph with two flutes, riding a winged dragon's back. With this piece, the artist (Xaime Quessada) pays tribute to Galicia's oral culture and the medieval poets and troubadours who, like Martin Codax, or Mendinho, celebrated the bounties of Vigo's sea.

Mendinho, also Meendinho, Mendiño and Meendiño, was a medieval Iberian poet.

Nothing is known about Mendinho except by inference. Scholars generally assume from the reference to the shrine of San Simión (on the Isle of San Simón, Rías Baixas of Vigo, Spain) that he was Galician. And it is supposed from his name (without any accompanying patronym or toponym), his style, and the place of his song in the manuscripts (the Cancioneiro da Vaticana, Vatican Library, and the Cancioneiro da Biblioteca Nacional, Lisbon, Portugal) that he was a jogral — a non-noble Minstrel.

Mendinho may have been active in the early 13th century, making him one of the earliest poets in this genre whose work has survived. A single cantiga de amigo (song about a boyfriend sung in the feminine) is attributed to him: Sedia-m' eu na ermida de San Simion, but it is among the most famous in the Galician-Portuguese lyric corpus of around 1685 texts. It has been admired for its imagery (critics say the girl is afraid of the waves of her own passion), its rhythm, and its formal and semantic parallelism (including the system of alternating strophes with the rhymes-sounds -on(or)/-ar). The text in the manuscripts is problematic in places, especially in the refrain, where the reading is much disputed.

In 1998, the Día das Letras Galegas (Galician Letters Day) was dedicated to Mendinho, along with Martín Codax and Xohán de Cangas. His single known poem was set to music by Alain Oulman, the French composer and long term musical collaborator of the great Portuguese Fado singer Amália Rodrigues. An English translation/adaptation of Sedia-m'eu na ermida... is contained in the longpoem The Tale of Tekarionyoken (2013) by Thomas M. Capuano (p. 33).

== Sediam'eu na ermida de San Simión ==
Text of Cohen 2003, slightly modified.

Sedia-m'eu na ermida de San Simion
e cercaron-mi as ondas, que grandes son,
eu atendendo meu amigo.

Estando na ermida ant'o altar,
cercaron-mi as ondas grandes do mar,
eu atendendo meu amigo.

E cercaron-mi as ondas, que grandes son:
non ei i barqueiro, nen remador,
eu atendendo meu amigo.

E cercaron-mi as ondas do alto mar:
non ei i barqueiro, nen sei remar,
eu atendendo meu amigo.

Non ei i barqueiro, nen remador:
e morrerei fremosa no mar maior,
eu atendendo meu amigo.

Non ei i barqueiro, nen sei remar:
e morrerei eu fremosa no alto mar,
eu atendendo meu amigo.

Translation:

I was sitting at the shrine of San Simeon
And the waves surrounded me, how high they were,
Me waiting for my friend/date.

Sitting at the shrine, before the altar,
The high waves of the sea surrounded me,
Me waiting for my friend/date.

And the waves surrounded me, how high they were:
I have no boatman, nor any one to row,
Me waiting for my friend/date.

And the waves of the high sea surrounded me:
I have no boatman and don’t know how to row,
Me waiting for my friend/date.

I have no boatman, nor anyone to row:
And I’ll die, beautiful me, in the vast sea,
Me waiting for my friend/date.

I have no boatman and don’t know how to row,
And I’ll die, beautiful me, in the sea so vast,
Me waiting for my friend/date.

== Notes ==
- Cohen, Rip. 500 Cantigas d’ Amigo: Edição Crítica (Porto: Campo das Letras, 2003).
- Ferreira, M. do Rosário. Águas Doces, Águas Salgadas: da funcionalidade dos motivos aquáticos nas cantigas de amigo (Oporto: Granito, 1999), pp. 41–53.
- Montero, Xesús Alonso. “Fortuna literaria de Meendiño”, in Estudos Portugueses. Homenagem a Luciana Stegagno Picchio (Lisbon: Difel, 1991), pp. 86–109
- Oliveira, António Resende de. Depois do Espectáculo Trovadoresco. a estrutura dos cancioneiros peninsulares e as recolhas dos séculos XIII e XIV (Lisbon: Edições Colibri, 1994), pp. 391–92.
- Reckert, Stephen & Helder Macedo. Do cancioneiro de Amigo (Lisbon: Assírio e Alvim, 1996), pp. 145–51.
- Tavani, Giuseppe. "Meendinho", in G. Lanciani & G. Tavani, edd., Dicionário da Literatura Medieval Galega e Portuguesa (Lisbon: Caminho, 1993), p. 456.
- Tavani, Giuseppe. Trovadores e Jograis: Introdução à poesia medieval galego-portuguesa (Lisbon: Caminho, 2002), pp. 417–18.
