= Pergaminho Sharrer =

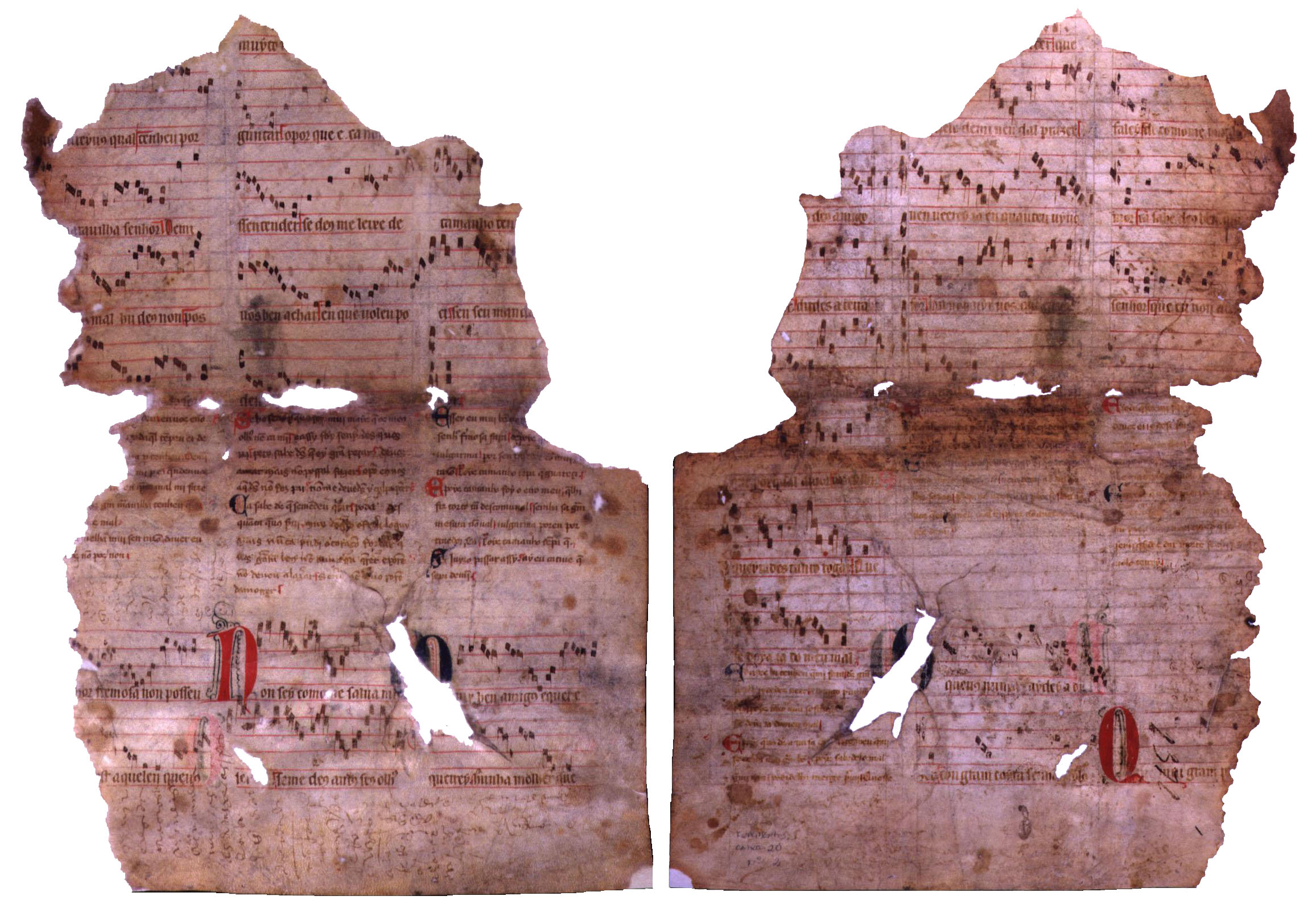
The Pergaminho Sharrer with songs by King Dinis I

The Pergaminho Sharrer (European Portuguese: [pɨɾɣɐˈmiɲu ˈʃaʁɛɾ]; Galician: Pergamiño Sharrer [peɾɣaˈmiɲʊ ˈʃarɪɾ]; "Sharrer Parchment") is a mediaeval parchment fragment containing seven songs by King Denis of Portugal, with lyrics in the Galician-Portuguese language and musical notation.

The fragment was discovered in 1990 by American scholar Harvey L. Sharrer, of the University of California, Santa Barbara. Sharrer was analysing documents in the Torre do Tombo archive in Lisbon, when he found the folio in the binding of a 16th-century book. Before Sharrer's discovery, the only known Galician-Portuguese mediaeval manuscript with love (non-religious) songs and musical notation was the Vindel Parchment, which contains seven songs by troubadour Martim Codax. Several songbooks covering the period exist, but only the religious Cantigas de Santa Maria have musical notation.

The text and musical notation of the Sharrer Parchment are fragmentary, due to damage done to the folio during the centuries; but further damage was inflicted during a disastrous attempt at restoration by Portuguese authorities. The parchment is written with Gothic letters and contains seven love songs (cantigas de amor). Even though the name of the author is not given, all songs appear in the same order in other songbooks (cancioneiros) of Galician-Portuguese poetry (the Cancioneiro da Biblioteca Nacional and the Cancioneiro da Vaticana), where they are attributed to King Dinis I of Portugal (reigned 1279–1325), known for his love of the arts. The folio probably belonged to a larger 14th century songbook that has been lost.

Since their discovery, the songs have been recorded by several groups dedicated to early music like the Theatre of Voices.

== Songs ==
The songs of the Sharrer Parchment are:

- Pois que vos Deus, amigo, quer guisar
- A tal estado m'adusse, senhor
- O que vos nunca cuidei a dizer
- Que mui gram prazer que eu hei, senhor
- Senhor fremosa, no poss'eu osmar
- Nom sei como me salv'a minha senhor
- Quix bem, amigos, e quer'e querrei

== See also ==
- Cancioneiro da Ajuda
- Cantiga de amigo
- Portuguese literature
