= Cantigas de escárnio e maldizer =

Genre of the Galician-Portuguese lyric

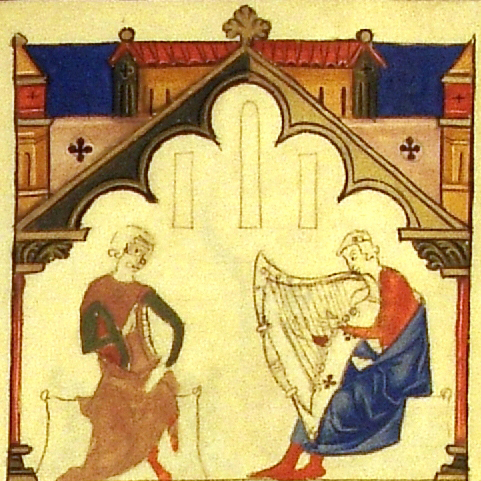
Picture introducing the cantiga de escárnio e maldizer "Pois nom hei de Dona Elvira" in the Cancioneiro da Ajuda

Cantigas de escárnio e maldizer (Portuguese), cantigas de escarnio e maldicir (Galician) or cantigas d'escarnho e de maldizer (Galician–Portuguese), are poems of insult and mockery—nearly always with comic intent—which constitute one of the three main genres of medieval Galician-Portuguese lyric. Their origins can be traced back to the Iberian tradition, as a continuation of Roman customs.

== See also ==
- Cantiga de amigo
- Cantiga de amor
