= Airas Nunes =

Galician cleric and troubador

Airas Nunes (c. 1230 – 1293) was a Galician cleric and troubador of the 13th century. He served under a bishop and much later, between 1284 and 1289, was a poet in the court of Sancho IV of Castille.

His songs are written in medieval Galician-Portuguese. Fourteen of his compositions are known, of which six are love songs (Cantigas de Amor), three songs of the friend (Cantigas de Amigo), four satires, and a pastoral song. At times quotations from other authors, such as King Denis of Portugal, King Alfonso X of Castile, João Zorro and Nuno Fernandes Torneol, are found in his work.

It is thought that he may have collaborated in the composition of the Cantigas de Santa Maria of Alfonso X the Wise.
