= João Soares de Paiva =

Portuguese poet and nobleman

João Soares de Paiva (born c. 1140) was a Portuguese poet (trovador) and nobleman; often recognised as the first author in the Galician-Portuguese language. He held lands in northern Portugal near the falls of the river Paiva and also in Aragon, near Monzón, Tudela, and Pamplona, near the border with Navarre, as fiefs of the King of Aragon. While the Aragonese sovereign was in Provence, João's Aragonese territories were invaded by Sancho VII of Navarre. He wrote a cantiga d'escarnho entitled Ora faz ost'o senhor de Navarra attacking the king of Navarre for this.

The dating of this cantiga is problematic because the Aragonese king is not identified by name. If it was Peter II, then the poem was probably written either between 1200 and 1204, during a period of conflict between Navarre and Aragon, or in September 1213, while Peter was in Languedoc, where he died in the Battle of Muret. On the other hand, it may have been written between 1214 and 1216, while the child-king James I was staying at Monzón. However, James' good relations with Sancho make it likely that the incident occurred in the reign of Peter.
