= Lais de Bretanha =

The first page of the Lais in the Cancioneiro da Biblioteca Nacional is also the first page of songs in the manuscript

The Lais de Bretanha are a set of five anonymous Galician-Portuguese lyric poems on the Matter of Britain, dating to the late 13th or early 14th century. They are found in both the Cancioneiro da Biblioteca Nacional and the Cancioneiro da Vaticana. The order of the poems is the same in each songbook. They stand outside the standard genre classifications.

== The songs ==
Known by their incipits, the five lais are:

1. Amor, des que m'a vós cheguei, by Elis or Baço, the duke of Saxony who travelled to Britain in the time of King Arthur to avenge himself on Tristan, who had killed his father, and fell in love with Iseult. This song is based on the Lai de Hélys from the Tristan en prose.
2. O Marot haja mal grado, by four ladies in Ireland to Morholt, who sent all the ladies he captured to Ireland
3. Mui gram temp'há, par Deus, que eu nom vi, by Tristan the beloved without further explanation This song is based on Lonc tans a que il ne vit cele from the Tristan en prose.
4. Dom Amor, eu cant'e choro, possibly in the voice of Tristan, based on Lai du plour from the Tristan en prose.
5. Ledas sejamos hojemais!, by some ladies to Lancelot, when he was exiled by Queen Guinevere after being found with the daughter of King Pelles

Since the songs are written in the voices of figures from the Matter of Britain, four of them have a rubric explaining who composed it and, in three cases, the circumstances that led to it.

== Authorship ==
The actual authorship of the songs is unknown, but they are thought to be the work of a single author because of their consistent style. Since they depend on the Arthurian material in the Old French prose cycles, they must date to the second half of the 13th century at the earliest. They have been associated with the literary patronage of King Denis of Portugal or Count Pedro de Barcelos, who is more likely to have compiled the original collection on which the existing songbooks are based. The Lais have at some time or other been assigned to every Galician-Portuguese troubadour who shows any awareness of the Matter of Britain and even to Prince Peter of Aragon, whom Fernão Rodrigues Redondo claims wrote lais. None of these modern attempts at assigning authorship is convincing.

== Literary sources ==
Although three of the Lais de Bretanha are based on Old French songs, they are not strict translations. Lais 2 and 5, however, were not based on existing songs at all, but inspired by episodes from the Post-Vulgate Cycle. The former was written to explain the mutual hatred of Morholt and the ladies in the Suite du Merlin, while the latter expands upon a scene in Folie Lancelot in which some girls declare him to be the best knight in the world. It is unknown if the stories told in lais 2 and 5 themselves had Old French precedents that are now lost. Both are in the form of a bailada.

== Works cited ==
- Arbor Aldea, Mariña (2009). "Lais de Bretanha galego-portugueses e tradición manuscrita: as relacións entre B e L". In Maria Iliescu; Paul Danler; Heidi Siller (eds.). Actes du XXV^{e} Congrès International de Linguistique et de Philologie Romanes. Vol. 6. De Grouter Mouton. pp. 11–20.
- Entwistle, William James (1925). The Arthurian Legend in the Literatures of the Spanish Peninsula. J.M. Dent & Sons.
- Gutiérrez García, Santiago (2015). "Arthurian Literature in Portugal". In David Hook (ed.). The Arthur of the Iberians: The Arthurian Legends in the Spanish and Portuguese Worlds. University of Wales Press. pp. 58–117.
- Lorenzo Gradín, Pilar (2015). "The Matière de Bretagne in Galicia from the XIIth to the XVth Century". In David Hook (ed.). The Arthur of the Iberians: The Arthurian Legends in the Spanish and Portuguese Worlds. University of Wales Press. pp. 118–161.
- Nodar Manso, Francisco (1985). La narratividad de la poesía lírica galaicoportuguesa: estudio analítico. Edition Reichenberger.
- Videira Lopes, Graça; Ferreira, Manuel Pedro (2011–2026). "Cantigas Medievais Galego-Portuguesas". Instituto de Estudos Medievais, FCSH/NOVA.
