= Galician Romance =

Galician Romance may refer to:

- Galician language, a Romance language spoken in Galicia, Spain
- Galician-Portuguese, a Romance language spoken in the Kingdom of Galicia and County of Portugal, along with the languages that diverged from it
