= Martin Codax =

Galician medieval joglar

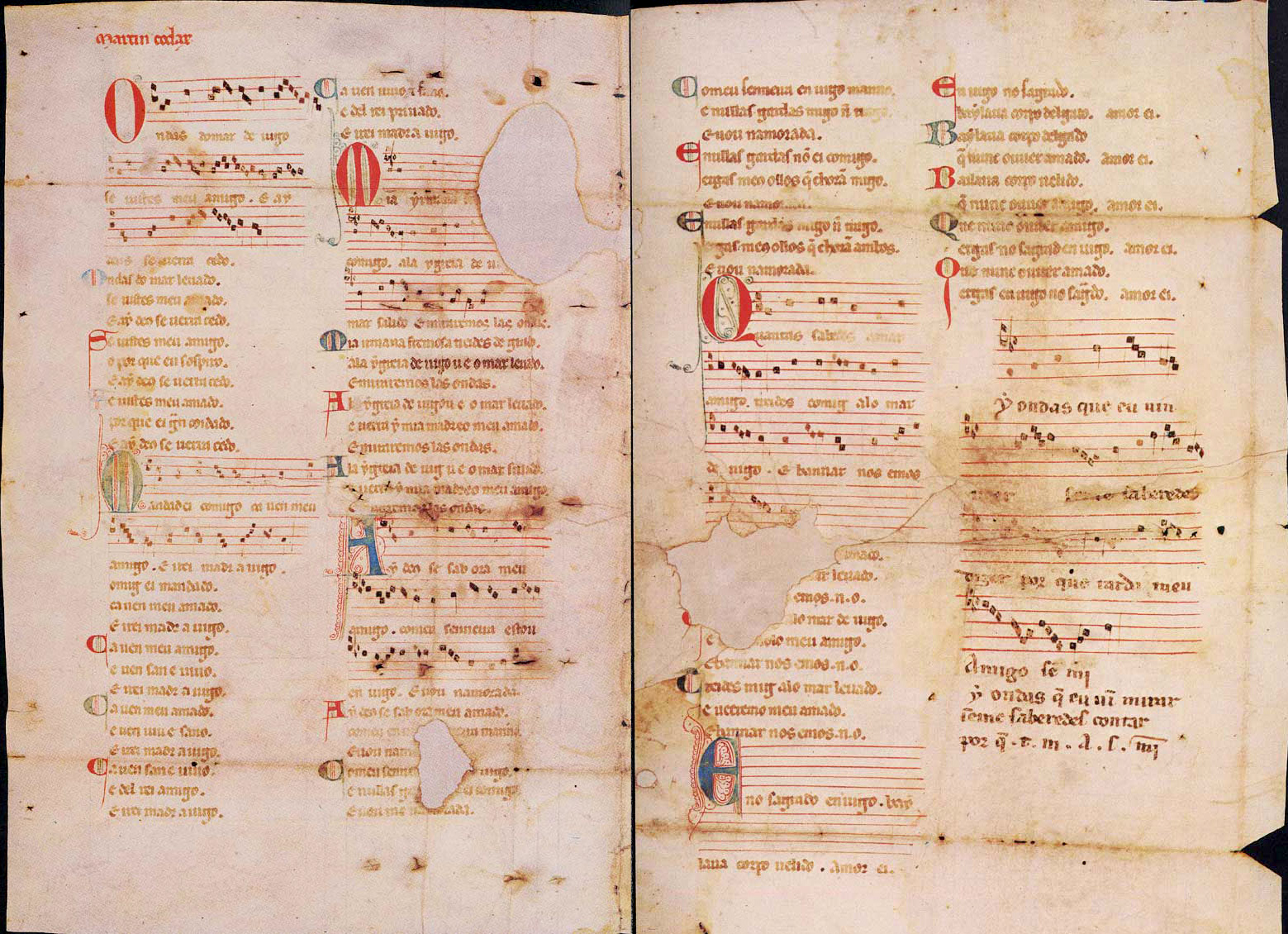
Cantigas de Amigo (Pierpont Morgan Library, New York, Vindel MS M979)

Martin Codax or Codaz, Martín Codax (Galician: [maɾˈtiŋ koˈðaʃ]) or Martim Codax was a Galician medieval joglar (non-noble composer and performer, as opposed to a trobador), possibly from Vigo, Galicia in present-day Spain. He may have been active during the middle of the thirteenth century, judging from scriptological analysis. He is one of only two out of a total of 88 authors of cantigas d'amigo who used only the archaic strophic form aaB (a rhymed distich followed by a refrain). He employed an archaic rhyme scheme whereby i~o / a~o were used in alternating strophes. In addition Martin Codax consistently utilised a strict parallelistic technique known as leixa-pren (see the example below; the order of the third and fourth strophes is inverted in the Pergaminho Vindel but the correct order appears in the Cancioneiro da Biblioteca Nacional in Portugal, and the Cancioneiro da Vaticana). There is no documentary biographical information concerning the poet, dating the work at present remains based on theoretical analysis of the text.

== Works in the Pergaminho Vindel ==
The body of work attributed to him consists of seven cantigas d'amigo which appear in the Galician-Portuguese songbooks and in the Pergaminho Vindel (Vindel parchment). In all three manuscripts he is listed as the author of the compositions, in all three the number and order of the songs is the same. This provides what may be important evidence to support the view that the order of other poets' songs in the cancioneiros (songbooks) should not automatically be dismissed as random or attributed to later compilers. The identification of authorship of the poems (and their order) may contribute to a viewpoint that the seven songs of Codax reflect an original performance set. Consequently, the sets of poems by other poets might also have been organized for performance.

The parchment was originally discovered by the Madrid-based antiquarian bookseller and bibliophile Pedro Vindel among his possessions in 1913; it had been used as the cover of a copy of Cicero's De Officiis.

Martim Codax's poems that appeared in the parchment are the following (originally untitled, they are listed by the first line):

- Ondas do mar de uigo
- Mandadei comigo
- Mia yrmana fremosa
- Ay deus se sabora meu amigo
- Quantas sabedes amar amigo
- E no sagrado en uigo
- Ay ondas que eu uin ueer

In the Pergaminho Vindel, musical notation (although with lacunae) survives along with the texts, except for the sixth one. They are the only cantigas d'amigo for which the music is known. The Pergaminho Sharrer contains seven melodies for cantigas d'amor of Denis of Portugal, also in fragmentary form.

== A cantiga by Martin Codax ==
Here is the third of his songs:

Mia irmana fremosa, treides comigo
a la igreja de Vigo u é o mar salido
e miraremos las ondas.

Mia irmana fremosa, treides de grado
a la igreja de Vigo u é o mar levado
e miraremos las ondas.

A la igreja de Vigo u é o mar salido
e verrá i mia madre e o meu amigo
e miraremos las ondas.

A la igreja de Vigo u é o mar levado
e verrá i mia madre e o meu amado
e miraremos las ondas.

Translation:

Lovely sister, come with me
To the church in Vigo where the sea is rough,
And we will gaze at the waves.

Lovely sister, come willingly
To the church in Vigo, where the sea is up,
And we will gaze at the waves.

To the church in Vigo where the sea is rough,
And my mother and my friend will come,
And we will gaze at the waves.

To the church in Vigo, where the sea is up,
And my mother and my beloved will come,
And we will gaze at the waves.

== See also ==
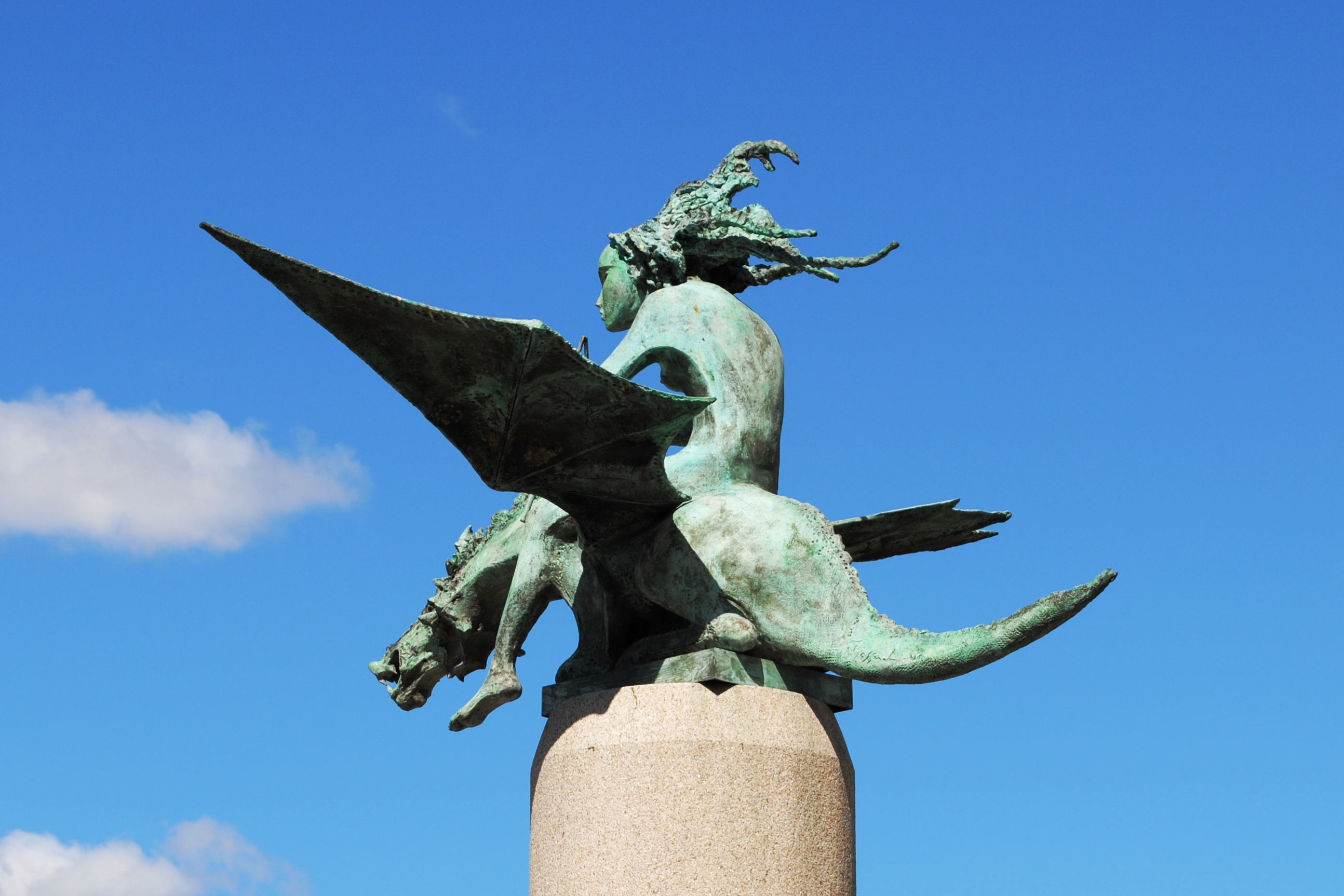
Paseo de Alfonso XII de Vigo: A fada e o dragón The sculpture, cast in bronze, represents a nymph with two flutes, riding a winged dragon's back. With this piece, the artist (Xaime Quessada) pays tribute to Galicia's oral culture and the medieval poets and troubadours who, like Martin Codax, or Mendinho, celebrated the bounties of Vigo's sea.

- Cantiga de amigo
- Galician-Portuguese
- Galician-Portuguese lyric
- Pergaminho Sharrer
