= The Legend of Ero of Armenteira =

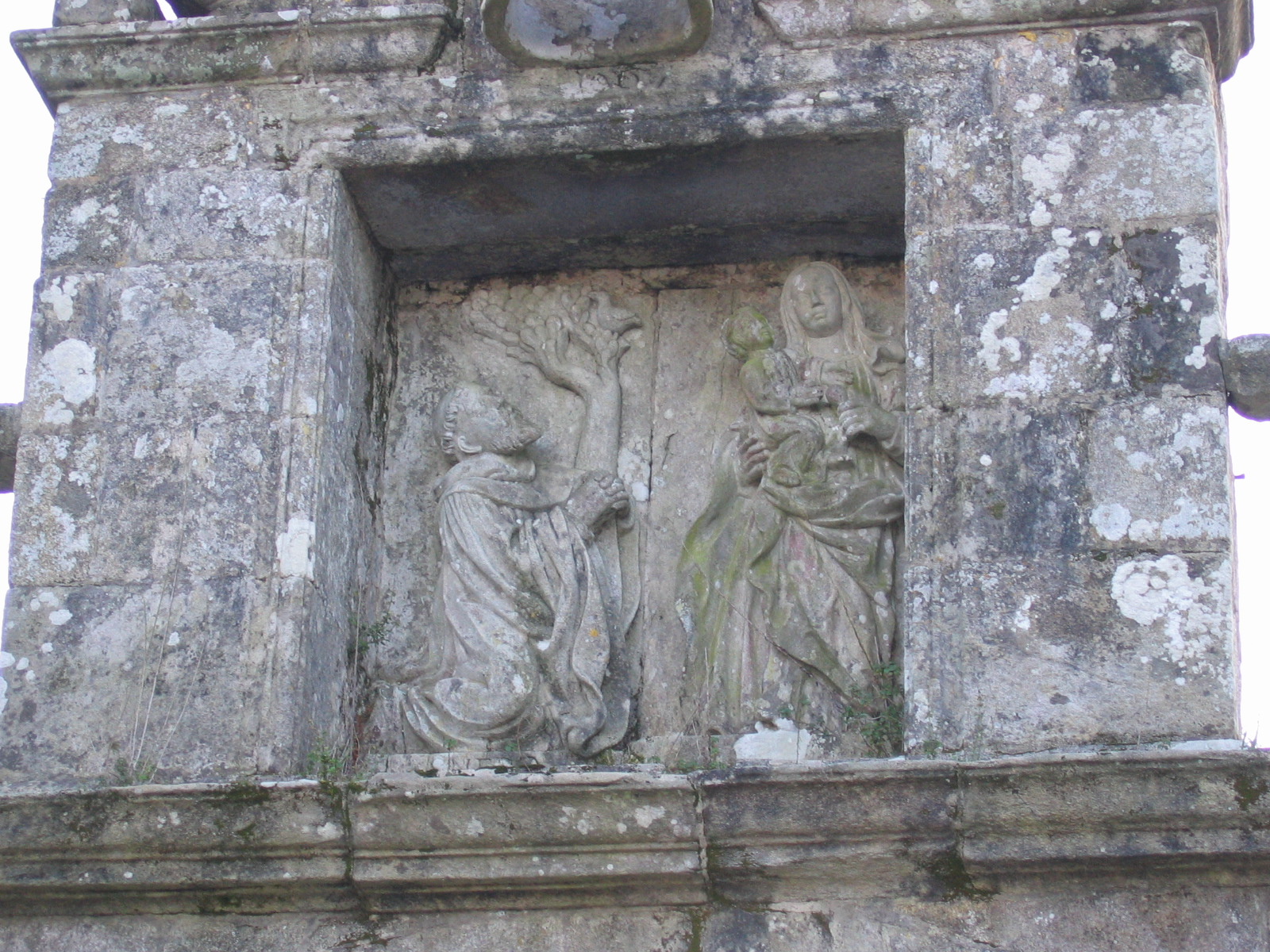

The abbot Ero, founder of the monastery of Santa María da Armenteira, is the subject of a legend.

== The miracle of Saint Mary ==
In the 12th century, a knight, Don Ero, lived with his wife in his palace in Armenteira, located in the slopes of Mount Castrove, near Mais in the Province of Pontevedra (Galicia, Spain). Don Ero and his wife were not able to have children, so they kept asking God to send them some descendants. God answered their prayers with the revelation that they would only have spiritual descent. For this reason they decided to found their own monasteries. Don Ero founded Santa María de Armenteira, right there in his lands. He requested help from Saint Bernard of Clairvaux, the founder of the Cistercian order, who sent him four monks to start the monastery. Years later, he became the abbot of the monastery himself.

Ero the Abbot was always begging the Virgin Mary to show him just a little vision of what the divine grace would be like. He longed for the day when he would be able to understand the concept of paradise bliss. He lived under the impression that his beloved Virgin did not listen to his prayers.

One day, he went for a walk around the woods that surrounded the monastery, a beautiful setting full of pine trees, oaks and other native species. He took a rest and sat on a stone. The chirp of a bird caught his attention. He sat there for a while, listening.

Not long after that, he headed back to his monastery, since it was already getting dark and he did not want his brethren to worry about him. When he knocked at the door of the monastery, he was received by a monk completely unknown to him. Distrustful, the monk asked him who he was. When he answered him that he was the abbot Ero, the monk, bewildered, started to call his brothers, not sure if the man was in his right mind. Ero told them who he was and what he had been doing. When the brethren explained what year they were in, Ero realized to his astonishment that three hundred years had passed by! And suddenly, he became aware that what he thought to have been only three minutes listening to a bird sing, had really been three hundred years contemplating the glory of paradise. Virgin Mary had finally granted him his wish.

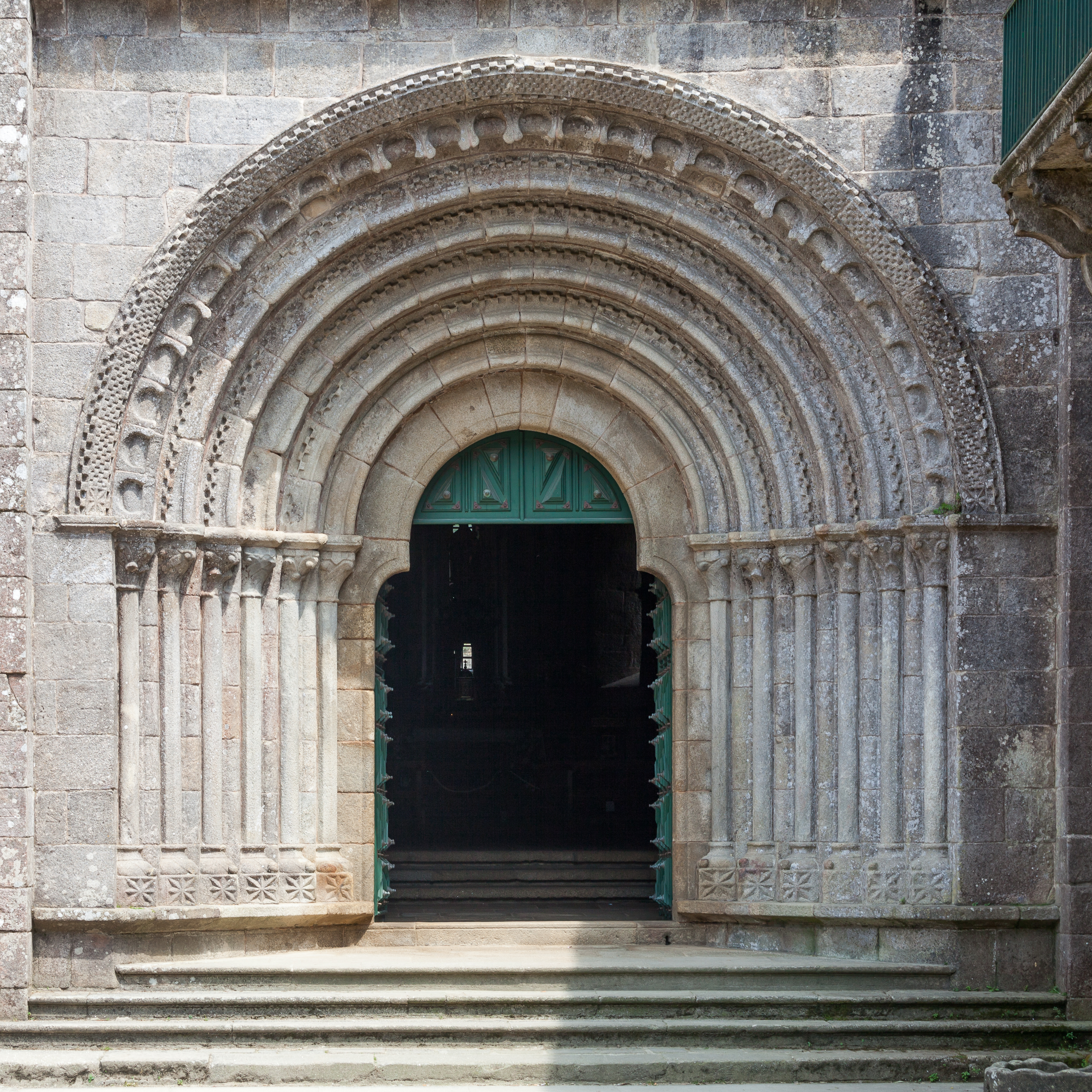
Monastery of Santa Maria de Armenteira.

== Cultural impact ==
This legend, related to others of similar content related to the Celtic tradition, became popular in the 13th century when the King Alfonso X the Wise included it in his Cantigas de Santa Maria, a recompilation of miracles attributed to Virgin Mary. He dedicated his cantiga (poem or song) number 103 to the legend of Saint Ero.

The Galician writer Ramón María del Valle Inclán also contributed to spreading the legend by including it in his work “Aromas de Leyenda” (1907), a collection of 14 poems inspired in several Galician traits like scenery, traditions and superstitions.
