= Cantigas de Santa Maria =

Medieval collection of Galician songs

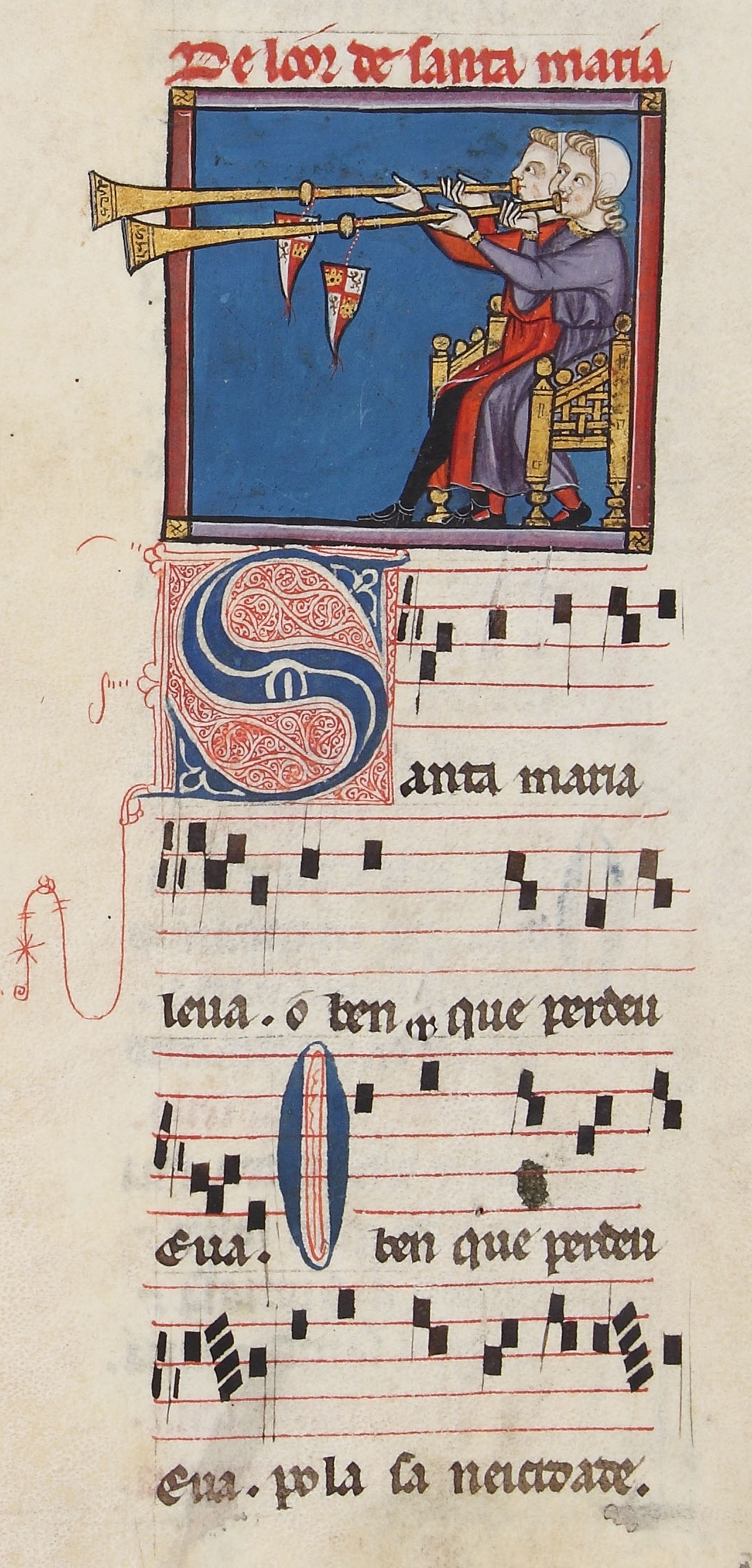
Illumination with buisine players from the E Codex (Bl-2, fol. 286R)

The Cantigas de Santa Maria (Galician: [kanˈtiɣɐz ðɪ ˈsantɐ maˈɾi.ɐ], Portuguese: [kɐ̃ˈtiɣɐʒ ðɨ ˈsɐ̃tɐ mɐˈɾi.ɐ]; "Canticles of Holy Mary") are 420 poems with musical notation, written in the medieval Galician-Portuguese language during the reign of Alfonso X of Castile El Sabio (1221–1284). Traditionally, they are all attributed to Alfonso, though scholars have since established that the musicians and poets of his court were responsible for most of them, with Alfonso being credited with a few as well.

It is one of the largest collections of monophonic (solo) songs from the Middle Ages and is characterized by the mention of the Virgin Mary in every song, while every tenth song is a hymn.

The Cantigas have survived in four manuscript codices: two at El Escorial, one at Madrid's National Library, and one in Florence, Italy. The E codex from El Escorial is illuminated with colored miniatures showing pairs of musicians playing a wide variety of instruments. The Códice Rico (T) from El Escorial and the one in the Biblioteca Nazionale Centrale of Florence (F) are richly illuminated with narrative vignettes.

== Description ==
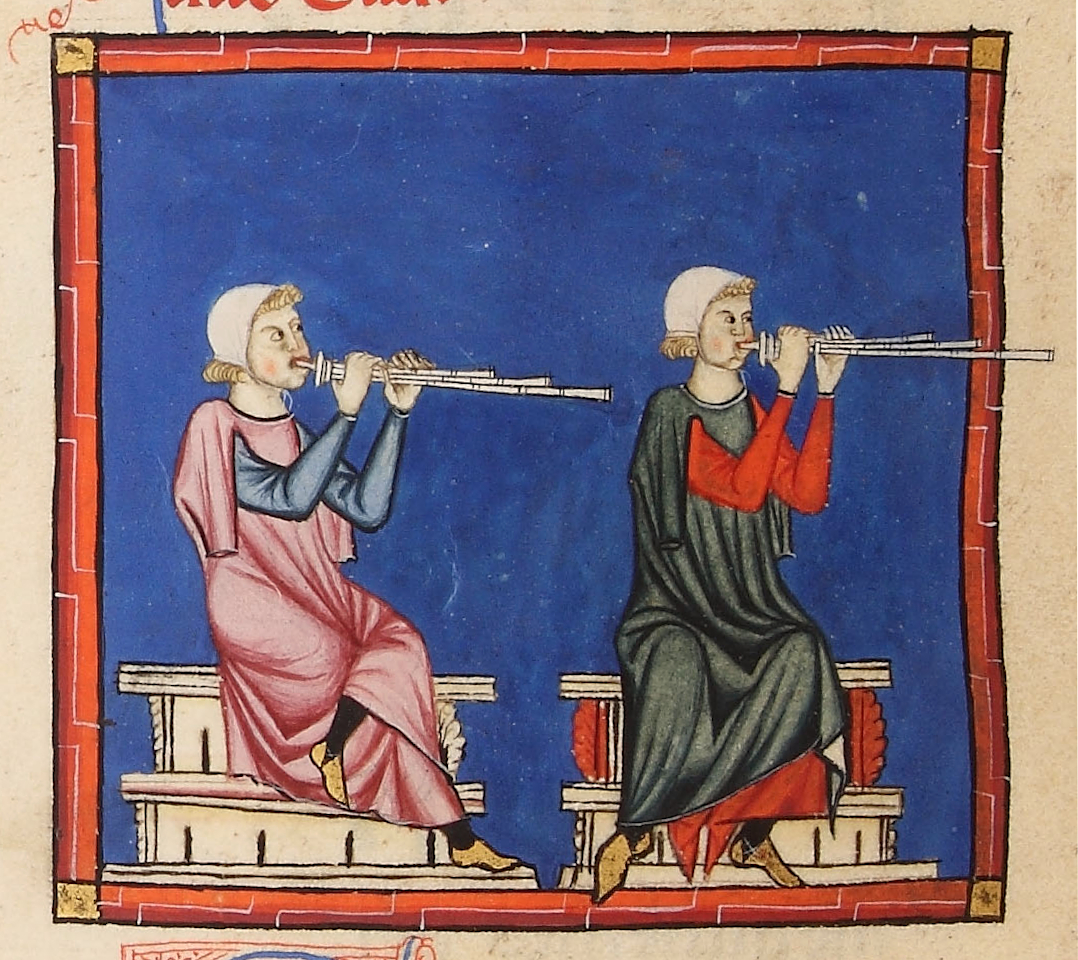
An illustration from the E Codex, Codex of the musicians, Cantigas de Santa Maria.

"Santa Maria, strela do dia"
Cantiga 100, "Santa Maria, strela do dia"

The Cantigas are written in the early Medieval Galician variety of Galician-Portuguese, using Galician spelling; this was because of Galician-Portuguese being fashionable as a lyrical language in Castile at the time, as well as Alfonso X having passed part of his early years in Galicia and so probably being a fluent speaker since his childhood.

The Cantigas are a collection of 420 poems, 356 of which are in a narrative format relating to Marian miracles; the rest of them, except an introduction and two prologues, are of songs of praise or involve Marian festivities. The Cantigas depict the Virgin Mary in a very humanized way, often having her play a role in earthly episodes.

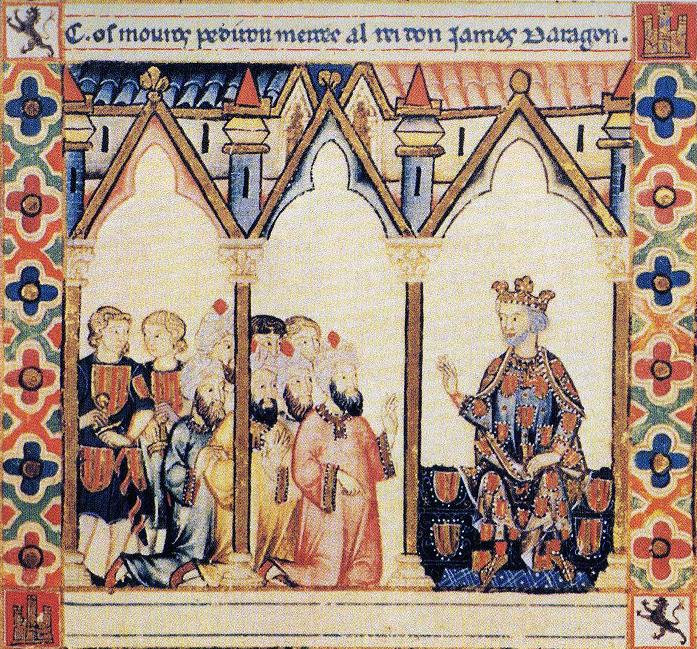
The Moors request permission from James I of Aragón, Cantigas de Santa Maria

The authors are unknown, although several studies have suggested that Galician poet Airas Nunes might have been the author of a large number of the Cantiga poems. King Alfonso X — named as Affonso in the Cantigas — is also believed to be an author of some of them as he refers to himself in the first person. Support for this theory can be found in the prologue of the Cantigas. Also, many sources credit Alfonso owing to his influence on other works within the poetic tradition, including his introduction on religious song. Although King Alfonso X's authorship is debatable, his influence is not. While the other major works that came out of Alfonso's workshops, including histories and other prose texts, were in Castilian, the Cantigas are in Galician-Portuguese, and reflect the popularity in the Castilian court of other poetic corpuses such as the cantigas d'amigo and cantigas d'amor.

The metrics are extraordinarily diverse: 280 different formats for the 420 Cantigas. The most common are the virelai and the rondeau. The length of the lines varies between two and 24 syllables. The narrative voice in many of the songs describes an erotic relationship, in the troubadour fashion, with the Divine. The music is written in notation which is similar to that used for chant, but also contains some information about the length of the notes. Several transcriptions exist. The Cantigas are frequently recorded and performed by early music groups, and quite a few CDs featuring music from the Cantigas are available.

=== Codices ===
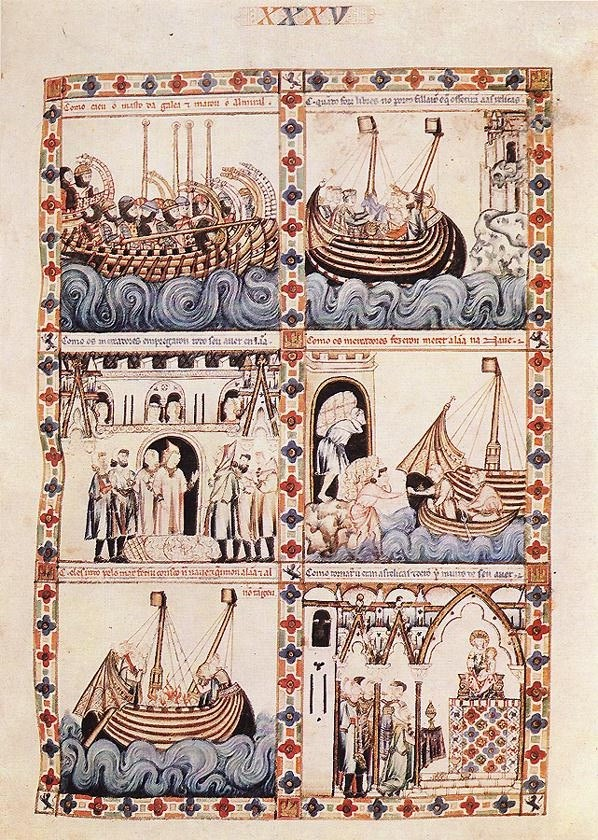
Miniatures, Codex Rico, Cantiga #35

The Cantigas are preserved in four manuscripts:

- To (códice de Toledo, Biblioteca Nacional de España, MS 10069, link to manuscript)
- T (códice rico, Biblioteca de El Escorial, MS T.I.1, link to manuscript)
- F (códice de Florencia, Florence, Biblioteca Nazionale, MS b.r. 20, link to manuscript)
- E (códice de los músicos, Biblioteca de El Escorial MS B.I.2, link to manuscript)

E contains the largest number of songs (406 Cantigas, plus the Introduction and the Prologue); it contains 41 carefully detailed miniatures and many illuminated letters. To is the earliest collection and contains 129 songs. Although not illustrated, it is richly decorated with pen flourished initials, and great care has been taken over its construction. The T and F manuscripts are sister volumes. T contains 195 surviving cantigas (8 are missing due to loss of folios) which roughly correspond in order to the first two hundred in E, each song being illustrated with either 6 or 12 miniatures that depict scenes from the cantiga. F follows the same format but has only 111 cantigas, of which 7 have no text, only miniatures. These are basically a subset of those found in the second half of E, but are presented here in a radically different order. F was never finished, and so no music was ever added. Only the empty staves display the intention to add musical notation to the codex at a later date. It is generally thought that the codices were constructed during Alfonso's lifetime, To perhaps in the 1270s, and T/F and E in the early 1280s up until the time of his death in 1284.

== The music ==
The musical forms within the Cantigas, and there are many, are still being studied. There have been many false leads, and there is little beyond pitch value that is very reliable. Mensuration is a particular problem in the Cantigas, and most attempts at determining meaningful rhythmic schemes have tended, with some exceptions, to be unsatisfactory. This remains a lively topic of debate and study. Progress, while on-going, has nevertheless been significant over the course of the last 20 years.

=== Modern recordings ===
There have been a number of modern recordings of the Cantigas by musicians interested in historical music, such as that of Eduardo Paniagua and Música Antigua, that of Federico Bardazzi and Ensemble San Felice, that of Esther Lamandier, and that of Jordi Savall. Due to the ambiguity of the original notation and each conductor's particular genius, these recordings greatly differ from one another.

== See also ==
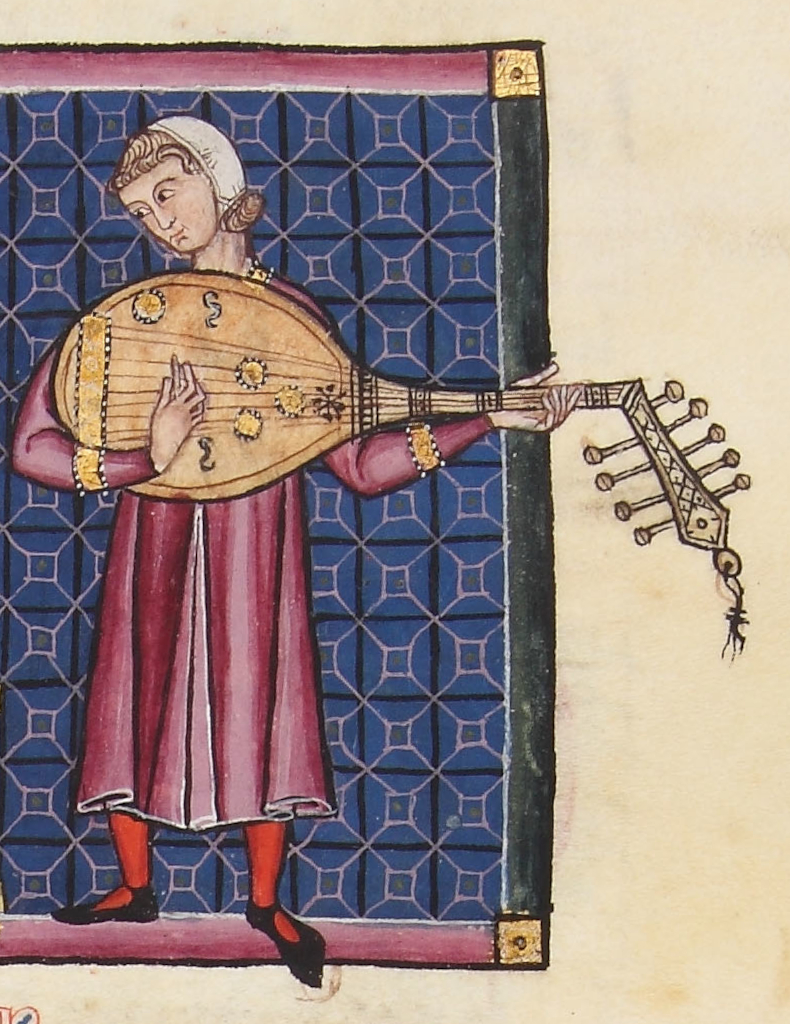
A lute player.

- Martin Codax
- The Legend of Ero of Armenteira
- Literature of Alfonso X
- Llibre Vermell de Montserrat
- Pergaminho Sharrer

== Bibliography ==
- Drummond, Henry T., The Cantigas de Santa Maria: Power and Persuasion at the Alfonsine Court, New Cultural History of Music. Oxford University Press, New York, 2024. ISBN 9780197670590
- Fassler, Margot (2014). Frisch, Walter (ed.). Music in the Medieval West. Western Music in Context: A Norton History (1st ed.). New York: W. W. Norton & Company. ISBN 978-0-393-92915-7.
- Ferreira, Manuel Pedro (Summer 2016). "The Medieval Fate of the Cantigas de Santa Maria: Iberian Politics Meets Song". Journal of the American Musicological Society. 69 (2): 295–353. doi:10.1525/jams.2016.69.2.295.
- Katz, Israel J. and John E. Keller, Studies on the "Cantigas de Santa Maria": Art, Music, and Poetry: Proceedings of the International Symposium on the "Cantigas de Santa Maria" of Alfonso X, el Sabio (1221–1284) in Commemoration of Its 700th Anniversary Year–1981. Associate Editors Samuel G. Armistead & Joseph T. Snow. Hispanic Seminary of Medieval Studies, Madison, 1987. ISBN 0-942260-75-9
- Kulp-Hill, Kathleen, ed., The Songs of Holy Mary by Alfonso X, the Wise: A Translation of the Cantigas de Santa Maria. Arizona Center for Medieval and Renaissance Studies, Tempe 2000. ISBN 0-86698-213-2
- Parkinson, Stephen, ed., Cobras e Son: Papers on the Text Music and Manuscripts of the "Cantigas de Santa Maria". European Humanities Research Centre, University of Oxford, Modern Humanities Research Association, 2000. ISBN 1-900755-12-2
- Pena, Xosé Ramón, "Historia da litratura medieval galego-portuguesa", Santiago de Compostela, 2002, 199–210.
