= João Zorro =

13th century minstrel

João Zorro was a late 13th century Galician or Portuguese minstrel at the court of Afonso III of Portugal, or as it is most likely at the court of Denis of Portugal. He is noted for his 10 cantigas de amigo about ancient sailors, written on the eve of the great voyages of discovery. Like most similar cantigas de amigo of his time, the musical notation wasn't recorded.

Zorro is unusual among medieval poets for writing about calm and domesticated seas, rather than about wild and deadly oceans. In his poems, sailors only lament about missing their home countries, lovers etc. His work sheds light on the attitudes towards the sea of the early European explorers.

== Works ==
His works were transcribed in the hypothetical "Livro das Cantigas", now lost but probably transcribed in the 16th century manuscripts called Cancioneiro da Biblioteca Nacional and Cancioneiro da Vaticana. They are mostly cantigas de amigo, ten in all, and only one cantiga de amor. The musical notation of his cantigas has not survived.

Like the also jogral Martim Codax sang mainly the themes related to the sea. A very particular feature of this author is the Ciclo "de Lisboa" (of the "barcas" or d'"El Rei de Portugal"), a uniform set in which the king of Portugal (D. Dinis I) appears as an intervener and in which there is a consistent reference to the throwing overboard of barcas from the medieval shipyards of Lisbon (then called tercenas and which occupied the space where the Paço da Ribeira was later built).
