= Cancioneiro da Vaticana =

Compilation of troubadour lyrics in Galician-Portuguese

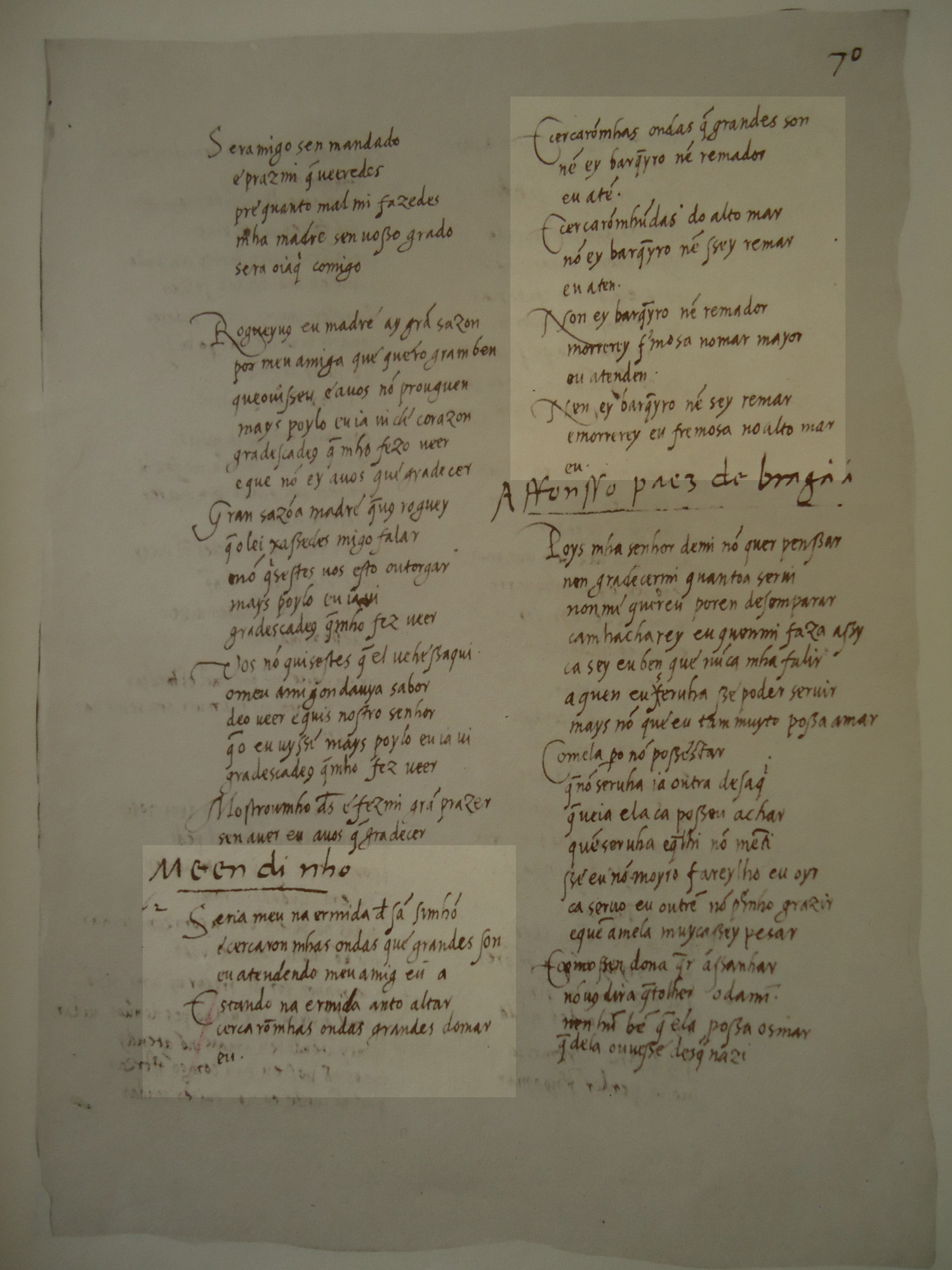
V 438

The Cancioneiro da Vaticana (Portuguese: [kɐ̃sjuˈnɐjɾu ðɐ vɐtiˈkɐnɐ], Galician: [kanθjoˈnejɾʊ ðɐ βatiˈkanɐ]; Vatican Songbook) is a compilation of troubadour lyrics in Galician-Portuguese. It was discovered c. 1840 in the holdings of the Vatican Library and was first transcribed by D. Caetano Lopes de Moura in 1847, sponsored by the Viscount of Carreira, and again by Ernesto Monaci in 1875.

The songbook contains 228 folios with a total of 1205 lyrics that date from the 13th and 14th centuries. Nearly all the poems belong to the three principal genres of secular cantigas: the cantigas de amigo, cantigas de amor and cantigas de escárnio e maldizer. Even though the texts were meant to be sung, there is no musical notation—nor space left for it (see Cancioneiro da Ajuda).

The Cancioneiro da Vaticana, together with the Cancioneiro da Biblioteca Nacional (kept in Lisbon), were copied from an earlier manuscript (or manuscripts) around 1525, in Rome Italy at the behest of the Italian humanist Angelo Colocci. The two songbooks are either sister manuscripts or cousins.

== See also ==
- Cantigas de Santa Maria
- Portuguese literature
- Music history of Portugal
