= Cantiga de amigo =

Genre of the Galician–Portuguese lyric

Cantiga de amigo (Portuguese: [kɐ̃ˈtiɣɐ ð(j) ɐˈmiɣu], Galician: [kanˈtiɣɐ ðɪ aˈmiɣʊ]) or cantiga d'amigo (Galician–Portuguese spelling), literally "friend song", is a genre of medieval lyric poetry, more specifically the Galician-Portuguese lyric, apparently rooted in a female-voiced song tradition native to the northwest quadrant of the Iberian Peninsula.

== Characteristics ==
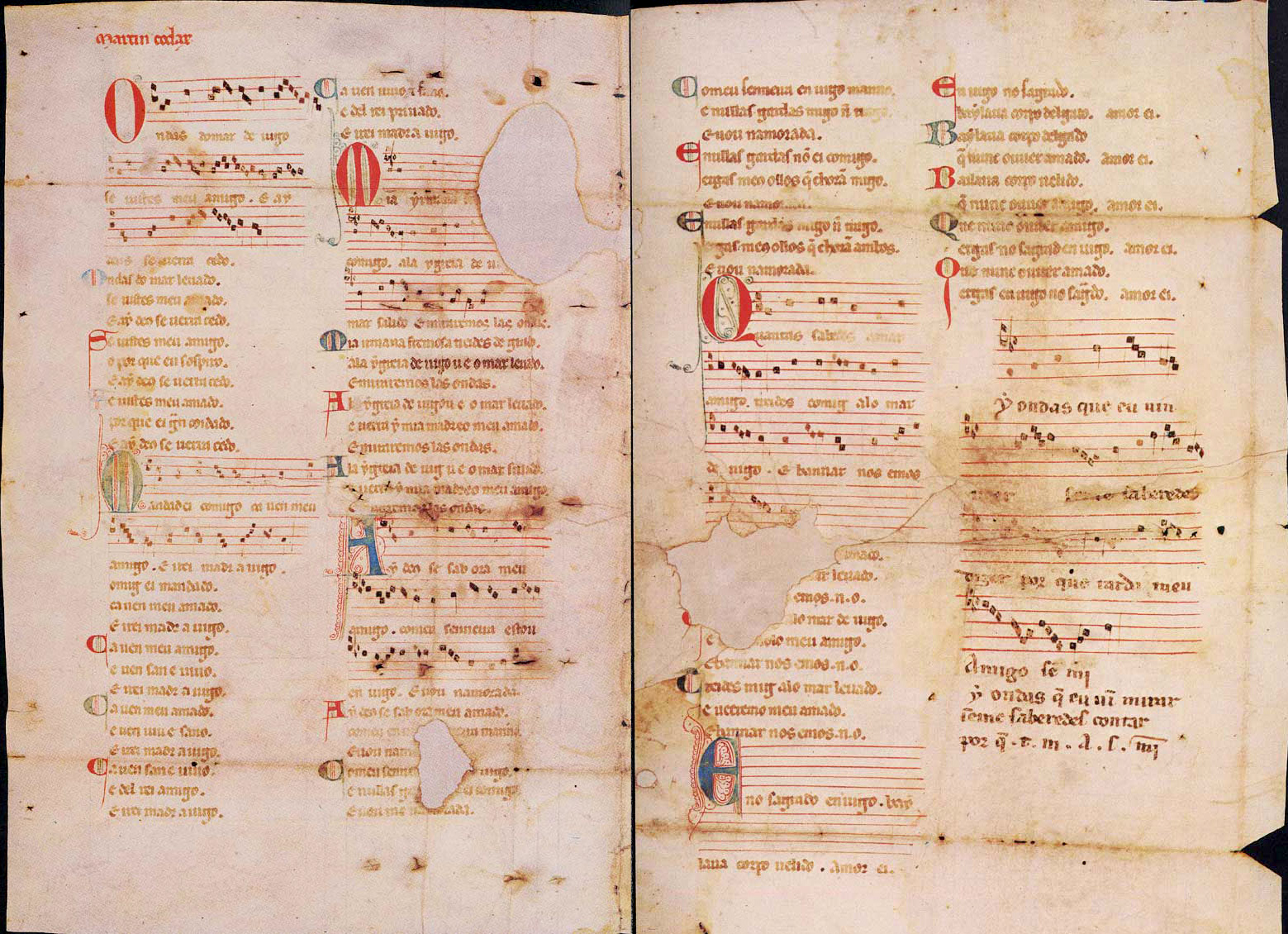
Manuscript of Martín Codax's cantigas de amigo, 13th century

What mainly distinguishes the cantiga de amigo is its focus on a world of female-voiced communication. The earliest examples that survive are dated from roughly the 1220s, and nearly all 500 were composed before 1300. Cantigas d'amigo are found mainly in the Cancioneiro Colocci-Brancuti, now in Lisbon's Biblioteca Nacional, and in the Cancioneiro da Vaticana, both copied in Italy at the beginning of the 16th century (possibly around 1525) at the behest of the Italian humanist Angelo Colocci. The seven songs of Martin Codax are also contained, along with music (for all but one text), in the Pergaminho Vindel, probably a mid-13th-century manuscript and unique in all Romance philology.

Stylistically, they are characterized by simple strophic forms, with repetition, variation, and parallelism, and are marked by the use of a refrain (88% of the texts). They constitute the largest body of female-voiced love lyric that has survived from ancient or medieval Europe. There are eighty-eight authors, all male, some of the better known being King Dinis of Portugal (52 songs in this genre), Johan Airas de Santiago (45), Johan Garcia de Guilhade (22), Juião Bolseiro (15), Johan Baveca (13), Pedr' Amigo de Sevilha (10), João Zorro (10), Pero Meogo (9), Bernal de Bonaval (8), Martim Codax (7). Even Mendinho, author of a single song, has been acclaimed as a master poet.

== Types of cantigas ==
- Tençon is a lyric and satiric cantiga which uses dialogue.

== Samples ==
Below are two cantigas d'amigo by Bernal de Bonaval (text from Cohen 2003, tr. Cohen 2010).

=== Bernal de Bonaval 7 ===
Rogar vos quer' eu, mha madre e mha senhor,
que mi non digades oje mal, se eu for
a Bonaval, pois meu amig' i ven

Se vos non pesar, mha madre, rogar vos ei,
por Deus, que mi non digades mal, e irei
a Bonaval, pois meu amig' i ven

Translation:

I want to ask you, my mother and madam,
That you not speak ill of me today, if I go
To Bonaval, since my boy is coming there.

If it doesn't upset you, my mother, I will ask,
By God, that you not speak ill of me, and I'll go
To Bonaval, since my boy is coming there.

=== Bernal de Bonaval 8 ===
Filha fremosa, vedes que vos digo:
que non faledes ao voss' amigo
sen mi, ai filha fremosa

E se vós, filha, meu amor queredes,
rogo vos eu que nunca lhi faledes
sen mi, ai filha fremosa

E al á i de que vos non guardades:
perdedes i de quanto lhi falades
sen mi, ai filha fremosa

Translation:

Lovely daughter, look what I'm telling you:
Do not talk with your boyfriend
Without me, o lovely daughter.

And, daughter, if you want my love,
I ask you that you never talk with him
Without me, o lovely daughter.

And there's something else you're careless about:
You lose every word you talk with him
Without me, o lovely daughter.

== See also ==
- Cancioneiro da Ajuda
- Cantigas de Santa Maria
- Occitan literature
- Pergaminho Sharrer

== Bibliography ==
- Estébanez Calderón, Demetrio (2000). Breve diccionario de términos literarios. Madrid: Alianza Editorial. pp. 62–63. ISBN 9788420636177.
- Mercedes Brea & Pilar Lorenzo Gradín, A Cantiga de Amigo, Vigo: Edicións de Galicia, 1998.
- Rip Cohen, 500 Cantigas d'amigo: A Critical Edition, Porto, Campo das Letras, 2003. https://jscholarship.library.jhu.edu/handle/1774.2/33843
- Rip Cohen, The Cantigas d'amigo: An English Translation. JScholarship, Johns Hopkins University, Baltimore, 2010. https://jscholarship.library.jhu.edu/handle/1774.2/33843)
- Peter Dronke, The Medieval Lyric, Cambridge, D.S. Brewer, 1968.
- Giuseppe Tavani, Trovadores e Jograis: Introdução à poesia medieval galego–portuguesa, Lisbon, Caminho, 2002.
