= Galician-Portuguese lyric =

Lyric and poetic movement

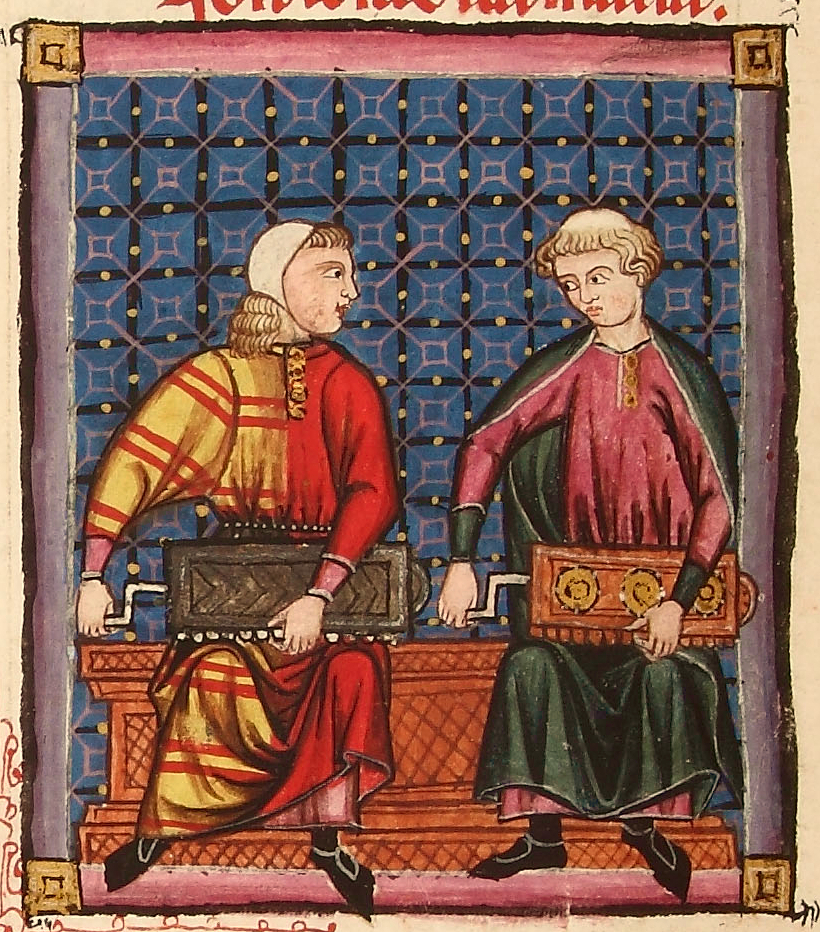
Symphonia de Cantiga from the Cantigas de Santa Maria

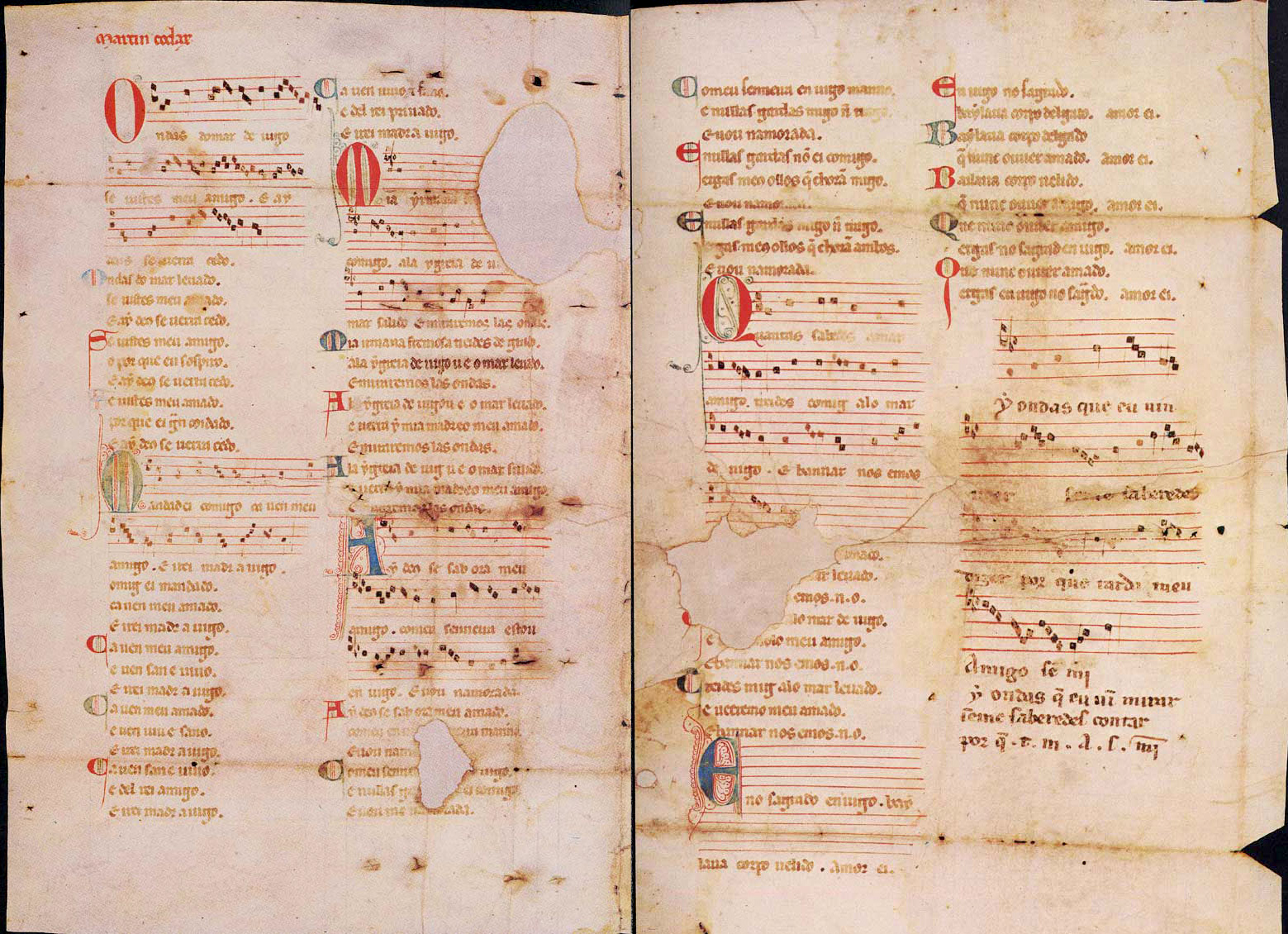
A song of Martim Codax from the Pergaminho Vindel

In the Middle Ages, the Galician-Portuguese lyric, also known as trovadorismo in Portuguese and trobadorismo in Galician, was a lyric poetic school or movement. All told, there are around 1680 texts in the so-called secular lyric or lírica profana (see Cantigas de Santa Maria for the religious lyric). At the time Galician-Portuguese was the language used in nearly all of Iberia for lyric (as opposed to epic) poetry. From this language derives both modern Galician and Portuguese. The school, which was influenced to some extent (mainly in certain formal aspects) by the Occitan troubadours, is first documented at the end of the twelfth century and lasted until the middle of the fourteenth, with its zenith coming in the middle of the thirteenth century, centered on the person of Alfonso X, The Wise King. It is the earliest known poetic movement in Galicia or Portugal and represents not only the beginnings of but one of the high points of poetic history in both countries and in medieval Europe. Modern Galicia has seen a revival movement called neotrobadorismo.

The earliest extant composition in this school is usually agreed to be Ora faz ost' o senhor de Navarra by João Soares de Paiva, usually dated just before or after 1200. Traditionally, the end of the period of active trovadorismo is given as 1350, the date of the testament of D. Pedro, Count of Barcelos (natural son of King Dinis of Portugal), who left a Livro de Cantigas (songbook) to his nephew, Alfonso XI of Castile.

The troubadours of the movement, not to be confused with the Occitan troubadours (who frequented courts in nearby León and Castile), wrote almost entirely cantigas (although there were several kinds of cantiga) with, apparently, monophonic melodies (only fourteen melodies have survived, in the Pergaminho Vindel and the Pergaminho Sharrer, the latter badly damaged during restoration by Portuguese authorities). Their poetry was meant to be sung, but they emphatically distinguished themselves from the jograes who in principle sang, but did not compose (though there is much evidence to contradict this). It is not clear if troubadours performed their own work.

Beginning probably around the middle of the thirteenth century, the songs, known as cantares, cantigas or trovas, began to be compiled in collections known as cancioneiros (songbooks). Three such anthologies are known: the Cancioneiro da Ajuda, the Cancioneiro Colocci-Brancuti (or Cancioneiro da Biblioteca Nacional de Lisboa), and the Cancioneiro da Vaticana. In addition to these there is the priceless collection of over 400 Galician-Portuguese cantigas in the Cantigas de Santa Maria, which tradition attributes to Alfonso X, in whose court (as nearly everywhere in the Peninsula) Galician-Portuguese was the only language for lyric poetry (except for visiting Occitan poets).

The Galician-Portuguese cantigas can be divided into three basic genres: male-voiced love poetry, called cantigas de amor (or cantigas d'amor); female-voiced love poetry, called cantigas de amigo (cantigas d'amigo); and poetry of insult and mockery called cantigas d'escárnio e de mal dizer. All three are lyric genres in the technical sense that they were strophic songs with either musical accompaniment or introduction on a stringed instrument. But all three genres also have dramatic elements, leading early scholars to characterize them as lyric-dramatic.

The origins of the cantigas d'amor are usually traced to Provençal and Old French lyric poetry, but formally and rhetorically they are quite different. The cantigas d'amigo are probably rooted in a native song tradition (Lang, 1894, Michaëlis 1904), though this view has been contested. The cantigas d'escarnho e maldizer may also (according to Lang) have deep local roots. The latter two genres (totalling around 900 texts) make the Galician-Portuguese lyric unique in the entire panorama of medieval Romance poetry.

== List of manuscripts ==
- A = Cancioneiro da Ajuda, Biblioteca do Palácio Real da Ajuda (Lisbon).
- B = Cancioneiro Colocci-Brancuti, Biblioteca Nacional (Lisbon), cod. 10991.
- N = Pierpont Morgan Library (New York), MS 979 (= PV).
- S = Arquivo Nacional da Torre do Tombo, Capa do Cart. Not. de Lisboa, N.º 7-A, Caixa 1, Maço 1, Livro 3 (see Sharrer 1991).
- V = Cancioneiro da Vaticana, Biblioteca Apostolica Vaticana, cod. lat. 4803.

== Bibliography ==
- Asensio, Eugenio. 1970. Poética e realidad en el cancionero peninsular de la Edad Media. 2nd ed. Madrid: Gredos.
- Cohen, Rip. 2003. 500 Cantigas d’Amigo, edição crítica/critical edition. Porto: Campo das Letras. https://jscholarship.library.jhu.edu/handle/1774.2/33843
- Ferreira, Manuel Pedro. 1986. O Som de Martin Codax. Sobre a dimensão musical da lírica galego-portuguesa (séculos XII-XIV). Lisbon: UNISYS/ Imprensa Nacional - Casa de Moeda.
- Ferreira, Manuel Pedro. 2005. Cantus Coronatus: 7 Cantigas d’El Rei Dom Dinis. Kassel: Reichenberger.
- Lanciani, Giulia and Giuseppe Tavani (edd.). 1993. Dicionário da Literatura Medieval Galega e Portuguesa. Lisbon: Caminho.
- Lanciani, Giulia, and Giuseppe Tavani. 1998. A cantiga de escarnho e maldizer, tr. Manuel G. Simões. Lisbon: Edições Colibri.
- Lang, Henry R. 1894. Das Liederbuch des Königs Denis von Portugal, zum ersten mal vollständig herausgegeben und mit Einleitung, Anmerkungen und Glossar versehen. Halle a.S.: Max Niemeyer (rpt. Hildesheim - New York: Georg Olms Verlag, 1972).
- Lang, Henry R. "The Relations of the Earliest Portuguese Lyric School with the Troubadours and Trouvères." Modern Language Notes, Vol. 10, No. 4. (Apr., 1895), pp. 104–116.
- Lapa, Manuel Rodrigues. 1970. Cantigas d’escarnho e de mal dizer dos cancioneiros medievais galego-portugueses, edição crítica. 2nd ed. Vigo: Editorial Galaxia.
- Mettmann, Walter. 1959-72. Afonso X, o Sabio. Cantigas de Santa Maria. 4 vols. Coimbra: Por ordem da Universidade (rpt. Vigo: Ediçóns Xerais de Galicia, 1981).
- Michaëlis de Vasconcellos, Carolina. 1904. Cancioneiro da Ajuda, edição critica e commentada. 2 vols. Halle a.S.: Max Niemeyer (rpt. with Michaëlis 1920, Lisboa: Imprensa Nacional - Casa de Moeda, 1990).
- Michaëlis de Vasconcellos, Carolina. 1920. "Glossário do Cancioneiro da Ajuda". Revista Lusitana 23: 1-95.
- Nobiling, Oskar. 1907a. As Cantigas de D. Joan Garcia de Guilhade, Trovador do Seculo XIII, edição critica, com notas e introdução. Erlangen: Junge & Sohn (= Romanische Forschungen 25 [1908]: 641-719).
- Nunes, José Joaquim. 1926-28. Cantigas d’amigo dos trovadores galego-portugueses, edição crítica acompanhada de introdução, comentário, variantes, e glossário. 3 vols. Coimbra: Imprensa da Universidade (rpt. Lisbon: Centro do Livro Brasileiro, 1973).
- Nunes, José Joaquim . 1932. Cantigas d’amor dos trovadores galego-portugueses. Edição crítica acompanhada de introdução, comentário, variantes, e glossário. Coimbra: Imprensa da Universidade (rpt. Lisbon: Centro do Livro Brasileiro, 1972).
- Oliveira, António Resende de. 1994. Depois do Espectáculo Trovadoresco, a estrutura dos cancioneiros peninsulares e as recolhas dos séculos XIII e XIV. Lisbon: Edições Colibri.
- Pena, Xosé Ramón. 2002. "Historia da literatura medieval galego-portuguesa". Vigo: Edicións Xerais.
- Rodrigues, Linda M. A. "On Originality, Courtly Love, and the Portuguese Cantigas." Luso-Brazilian Review, Vol. 27, No. 2. (Winter, 1990), pp. 95–107.
- Sharrer, Harvey L. "The Discovery of Seven cantigas d'amor by Dom Dinis with Musical Notation." Hispania, Vol. 74, No. 2. (May, 1991), pp. 459–461.
- Stegagno Picchio, Luciana. 1982. La Méthode philologique. Écrits sur la littérature portugaise. 2 vols. Paris: Fundação Calouste Gulbenkian, Centro Cultural Português.
- Tavani, Giuseppe. 2002. Trovadores e Jograis: Introdução à poesia medieval galego-portuguesa. Lisbon: Caminho.

For further bibliography see Galician-Portuguese.

- Tolman, Earl Dennis. "Critical Analysis of a Cantiga d'Escarnho." Luso-Brazilian Review, Vol. 8, No. 2. (Winter, 1971), pp. 54–70.
