= Galician–Portuguese =

Medieval West Iberian Romance language

- Galaic-Portuguese, Old Galician–Portuguese, Old Galician, Old Portuguese, Medieval Galician, Medieval Portuguese
- romanço, romançe, rimanço, galego, português
- Native to: Kingdom of Galicia, County of Portugal
- Region: Northwestern Iberia
- Era: Attested 870 A.D.; by 1400 had split into Galician, Fala, Portuguese and Eonavian.
- Language family: Indo-European: Italic; Latino-Faliscan; Romance; Italo-Western; Western Romance; Gallo-Iberian; Ibero-Romance; West Iberian; Galician–Portuguese
- Early forms: Old Latin: Vulgar Latin; Proto-Romance

Language codes
- ISO 639-3: –
- Linguist List: 079
- Glottolog: None
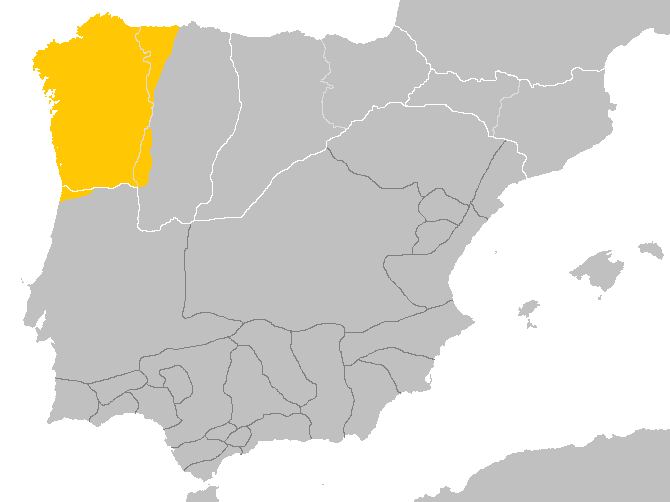
- Spoken area of Galician–Portuguese in the Kingdom of León around the 10th century, before the separation of the Galician and Portuguese languages.

Galician–Portuguese (Galician: galego-portugués or galaico-portugués; Portuguese: galego-português or galaico-português), also known as Old Galician–Portuguese, Galaic-Portuguese, or (in contexts focused on one of the modern languages) Old Galician, Old Portuguese, Medieval Galician or Medieval Portuguese, was a West Iberian Romance language spoken in the Middle Ages, in the northwest area of the Iberian Peninsula. It is both the ancestor language and historical period of development of the modern Galician, Fala, Portuguese and Eonavian languages which maintain a high degree of mutual intelligibility.

Galician–Portuguese was first spoken in the area bounded in the north and west by the Atlantic Ocean and by the Douro River in the south, comprising Galicia and northern Portugal, but it was later extended south of the Douro by the Reconquista.

The term "Galician–Portuguese" also designates the matching subdivision of the modern West Iberian group of Romance languages in Romance linguistics.

== Language ==
=== Origins and history ===
Map showing the historical retreat and expansion of Galician (Galician–Portuguese) within the context of its linguistic neighbours between the year 1000 and 2000

Galician–Portuguese developed in the region of the former Roman province of Gallaecia, from the Vulgar Latin (common Latin) that had been introduced by Roman soldiers, colonists and magistrates during the time of the Roman Empire. Although the process may have been slower than in other regions, the centuries of contact with Vulgar Latin, after a period of bilingualism, completely extinguished the native languages, leading to the evolution of a new variety of Latin with a few Gallaecian features.

Gallaecian and Lusitanian influences were absorbed into the local Vulgar Latin dialect, which can be detected in some Galician–Portuguese words as well as in placenames of Celtic and Iberian origin. In general, the more cultivated variety of Latin spoken by the Hispano-Roman elites in Roman Hispania had a peculiar regional accent, referred to as Hispano ore and agrestius pronuntians. The more cultivated variety of Latin coexisted with the popular variety. It is assumed that the Pre-Roman languages spoken by the native people, each used in a different region of Roman Hispania, contributed to the development of several different dialects of Vulgar Latin and that these diverged increasingly over time, eventually evolving into the early Romance languages of Iberia.

An early form of Galician–Portuguese was already spoken in the Kingdom of the Suebi and by the year 800 Galician–Portuguese had already become the vernacular of northwestern Iberia. The first known phonetic changes in Vulgar Latin, which began the evolution to Galician–Portuguese, took place during the rule of the Germanic groups, the Suebi (411–585) and Visigoths (585–711). Both the Galician–Portuguese "inflected infinitive" (or "personal infinitive") and the nasal vowels may have evolved under the influence of local Celtic languages (as in Old French). The nasal vowels would thus be a phonologic characteristic of the Vulgar Latin spoken in Roman Gallaecia, but they are not attested in writing until after the 6th and 7th centuries.

The oldest known document to contain Galician–Portuguese words found in northern Portugal is called the Doação à Igreja de Sozello and dated to 870 but otherwise composed in Late/Medieval Latin. Another document, from 882, also containing some Galician–Portuguese words is the Carta de dotação e fundação da Igreja de S. Miguel de Lardosa. In fact, many Latin documents written in Portuguese territory contain Romance forms. The Notícia de fiadores, written in 1175, is thought by some to be the oldest known document written in Galician–Portuguese. The Pacto dos irmãos Pais, discovered in 1999 (and possibly dating from before 1173), has been said to be even older, but despite the enthusiasm of some scholars, it has been shown that the documents are not really written in Galician–Portuguese but are in fact a mixture of Late Latin and Galician–Portuguese phonology, morphology and syntax. The Noticia de Torto, of uncertain date (c. 1214?), and the Testament of Afonso II (27 June 1214) are most certainly Galician–Portuguese. The earliest poetic texts (but not the manuscripts in which they are found) date from c. 1195 to c. 1225. Thus, by the end of the 12th century and the beginning of the 13th there are documents in prose and verse written in the local Romance vernacular.

In Galicia the oldest document showing traces of the underlying Romance language is a royal charter by king Silo of Asturias, dated to 775: it uses substrate words as arrogio and lagena, now arroio 'stream' and laxe 'stone', and presents also the elision of unstressed vowels and the lenition of plosive consonants; actually, many Galician Latin charters written during the Middle Ages show interferences of the local Galician–Portuguese contemporary language. As for the oldest document written in Galician–Portuguese in Galicia, it is probably a document from the monastery of Melón dated to 1231, since the Charter of the Boo Burgo of Castro Caldelas, dated to 1228, is probably a slightly later translation of a Latin original.

=== Literature ===
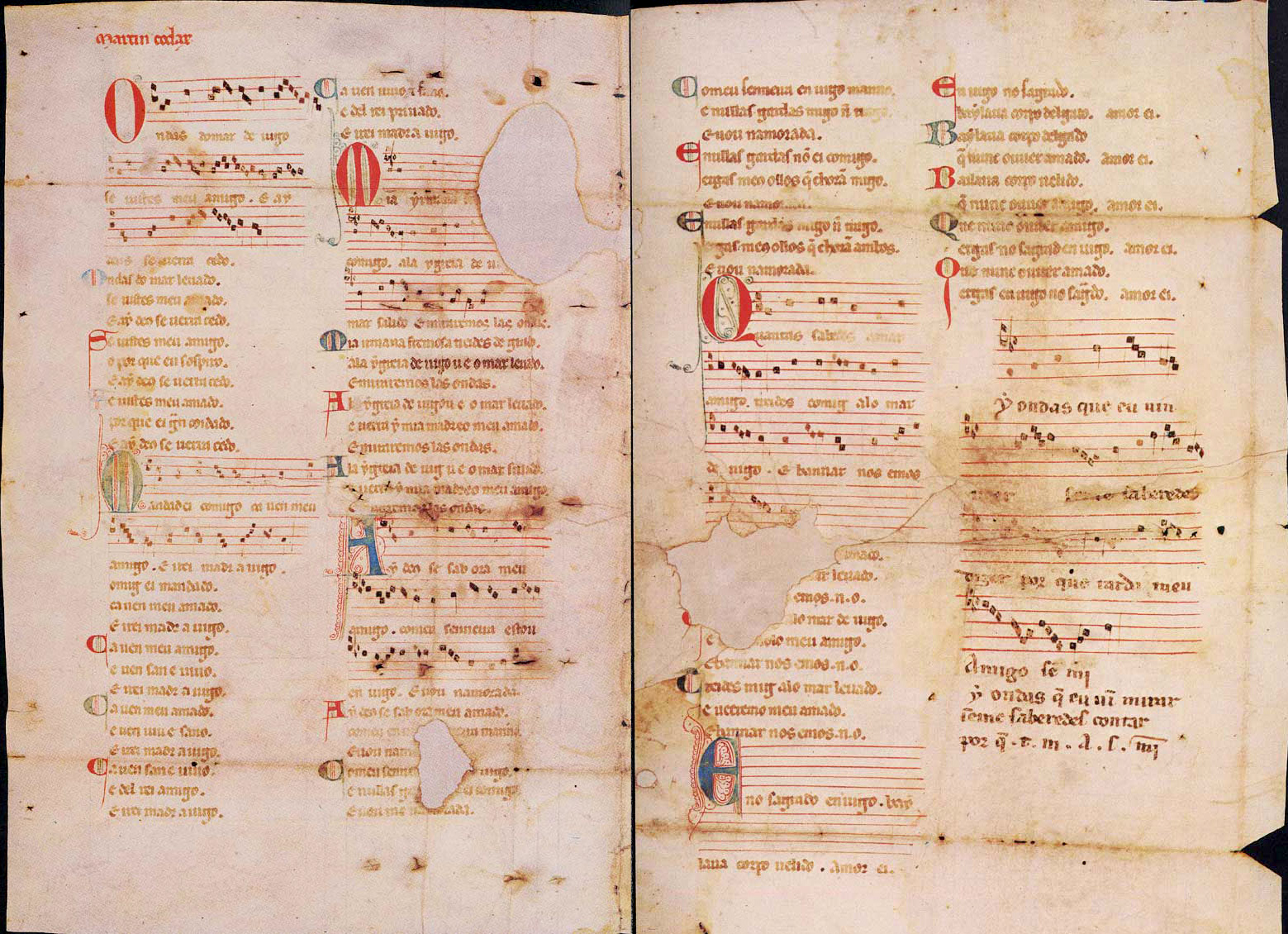
Pergaminho Vindel, containing works by Martin Codax

Galician–Portuguese had a special cultural role in the literature of the Christian kingdoms of Crown of Castile (Kingdoms of Castile, Leon and Galicia, part of the medieval NW Iberian Peninsula) comparable to the Catalan language of the Crown of Aragon (Principality of Catalonia and Kingdoms of Aragon, Valencia and Majorca, NE medieval Iberian Peninsula), or that of Occitan in France and Italy during the same historical period. The main extant sources of Galician–Portuguese lyric poetry are these:

- The four extant manuscripts of the Cantigas de Santa Maria (written under the patronage of, Alfonso X the Wise, king of Castile, Leon and Galicia from 1252–1284)
- Cancioneiro da Ajuda
- Cancioneiro da Vaticana
- Cancioneiro Colocci-Brancuti, also known as Cancioneiro da Biblioteca Nacional (Lisbon)
- Cancioneiro dun Grande de Espanha
- Pergaminho Vindel
- Pergaminho Sharrer
- Lais de Bretanha
- Tenzón entre Afonso Sánchez e Vasco Martíns de Resende

The language was used for literary purposes from the final years of the 12th century to roughly the middle of the 14th century in what are now Spain and Portugal and was, almost without exception, the only language used for the composition of lyric poetry. Over 160 poets are recorded, among them Bernal de Bonaval, Pero da Ponte, Johan Garcia de Guilhade, Johan Airas de Santiago, and Pedr' Amigo de Sevilha. The main secular poetic genres were the cantigas d'amor (male-voiced love lyric), the cantigas d'amigo (female-voiced love lyric) and the cantigas d'escarnho e de mal dizer (including a variety of genres from personal invective to social satire, poetic parody and literary debate).

All told, nearly 1,700 poems survive in these three genres, and there is a corpus of over 400 cantigas de Santa Maria (narrative poems about miracles and hymns in honor of the Holy Virgin). The Castilian king Alfonso X composed his cantigas de Santa Maria and his cantigas de escárnio e maldizer in Galician–Portuguese, even though he used Castilian for prose.

King Dinis of Portugal, who also contributed (with 137 extant texts, more than any other author) to the secular poetic genres, made the language official in Portugal in 1290. Until then, Latin had been the official (written) language for royal documents; the spoken language did not have a name and was simply known as lingua vulgaris until it was named "Portuguese" in King Dinis' reign. "Galician–Portuguese" and português arcaico ("Old Portuguese") are modern terms for the common ancestor of modern Portuguese and modern Galician. Compared to the differences in Ancient Greek dialects, the alleged differences between 13th-century Portuguese and Galician are trivial.

=== Divergence ===
As a result of political division, Galician–Portuguese lost its unity when the County of Portugal separated from the Kingdom of Leon to establish the Kingdom of Portugal. The Galician and Portuguese versions of the language then diverged over time as they followed independent evolutionary paths.

As Portugal's territory was extended southward during the Reconquista, the increasingly-distinctive Portuguese language was adopted by the people in those regions, supplanting the earlier Arabic and other Romance/Latin languages that were spoken in these conquered areas during the Moorish era. Meanwhile, Galician was influenced by the neighbouring Leonese language, especially during the time of kingdoms of Leon and Leon-Castile, and in the 19th and 20th centuries, it has been influenced by Castilian. Two cities at the time of separation, Braga and Porto, were within the County of Portugal and have remained within Portugal. Further north, the cities of Lugo, A Coruña and the great medieval centre of Santiago de Compostela remained within Galicia.

Galician was the main written language in Galicia until the 16th century, but was later displaced by Castilian Spanish, which was the official language of the Crown of Castille. Galician slowly became mainly an oral language, preserved by the majority rural or "uneducated" population living in the villages and towns, and Castilian was taught as the "correct" language to the bilingual educated elite in the cities. During most of the 16th, 17th and 18th centuries, its written use was largely reduced to popular literature and theatre and private letters. From the 18th century onward, the interest for the language grew by the studies of illustrious writers such as Martin Sarmiento, who studied the evolution of Galician from Latin and prepared the foundations for the first dictionary of Galician, José Cornide, and father Sobreira. In the 19th century, a true literature in Galician emerged during the Rexurdimento, followed by the appearance of journals and, in the 20th century, scientific publications. Because until comparatively recently, most Galicians lived in many small towns and villages in a relatively remote and mountainous land, the language changed very slowly and was only very slightly influenced from outside the region. That situation made Galician remain the vernacular of Galicia until the late 19th and early 20th centuries and its most spoken language until the early 21st century. The draft of the 1936 Galician Statute of Autonomy considered an official status for (Modern) Galician in the region, but it never came into force, as Galicia fell to rebel control upon the early stages of the Spanish Civil War.

The linguistic classification of Galician and Portuguese is still discussed today. There are those among Galician independence groups who demand their reunification as well as Portuguese and Galician philologists who argue that both are dialects of a common language rather than two separate ones.

The Fala language, spoken in a small region of the Spanish autonomous community of Extremadura, underwent a similar development to Galician.

Today, Galician is the regional language of Galicia (sharing co-officiality with Spanish), and is spoken by the majority of its population, but with a large decline of use and efficient knowledge among the younger generations, and the phonetics and lexicon of many occasional users is heavily influenced by Spanish. Portuguese continues to grow and, today, is the sixth most spoken language in the world.

== Phonology ==
Consonant phonemes of Galician–Portuguese
	Bilabial		Labio- dental	Dental/ Alveolar		Post- alveolar		Palatal	Velar	
Nasal	m			n				ɲ^{8}	ŋ^{9}	
Plosive	p	b^{1}		t^{3}	d^{1} ^{3}				k	ɡ^{1}
Fricative	β^{2}		f	s̺^{4}	z̺^{4}	ʃ	ʒ^{7}			
Affricates				t͡s̻^{4}	d͡z̻^{4}	t͡ʃ^{6}	d͡ʒ^{7}			
Lateral				l				ʎ		
Trill				r^{5}						
Flap				ɾ						

^{1} In Galician and European Portuguese, voiced stops may become allophonically and intervocally approximants [β̞, ð̞, ɣ̞]. However, this does not happen in Portuguese dialects from Brazil, Africa and Asia.
^{2} /β/ eventually shifted to /v/ in central and southern Portugal and merged with /b/ in northern Portugal and Galicia.
^{3} In most Brazilian dialects, t and d are palatalized to [tʃ] and [dʒ] before [i,ĩ] (e.g. tio [tʃi.u]). This includes cases where the [i,ĩ] results from epenthesis, such as when [i] is inserted after plosives that close syllables or words (e.g. atmosfera [a.tʃi.mos.fe.ra]), and in cases of word-final vowel raising when [e] becomes [i] (e.g. pedinte [pe.dʒĩ.tʃi]).
^{4} /s/ ⟨s-, -ss-⟩ and /z/ ⟨-s-⟩ were apico-alveolar [s̺, z̺], and /ts/ ⟨ç⟩ and /dz/ ⟨z⟩ were lamino-alveolar [t͡s̻, d͡z̻]. Later, all the affricate sibilants became fricatives [s̻, z̻], with the apico-alveolar and lamino-alveolar sibilants remaining distinct for a time but eventually merging in most dialects in different ways.

In Portuguese, lamino-alveolar sibilants [s̻] ⟨ç⟩ and [z̻] ⟨z⟩ merged into their respective apico-alveolars [s̺] ⟨s-, -ss-⟩ and [z̺] ⟨-s-⟩, contrasting only their voices [s, z].
In Galician, on the other hand (and just like in Peninsular Spanish), lamino-alveolar sibilants [s̻] ⟨ç⟩ and [z̻] ⟨z⟩ merged into a dental [θ], while apico-alveolar sibilants [s̺] ⟨s-, -ss-⟩ and [z̺] ⟨-s-⟩ merged into a sibilant [s̺], contrasting their sibilancy [s̺, θ]. In some regional varieties of Galician, however, sibilants may merge partially or totally into [s̺].
See History of Portuguese for more information.

^{5} In most Portuguese dialects, /r/ became a guttural consonant: a uvular in Portugal [ʀ, ʁ] and in Brazil its specter is wider [x, χ, h]. On the other hand, it is preserved as a trill [r] in many rural areas of Portugal, in several regions of Africa and Asia, and in Galician.
^{6} /t͡ʃ/ remained an affricate in Galician, but in Portuguese, it became a fricative [ʃ].
^{7} [ʒ] and [dʒ] probably occurred in complementary distribution, just like in several Catalan dialects. Eventually, [d͡ʒ] became a fricative [ʒ] and remained so in Portuguese, but it went further in Galician, becoming voiceless [ʃ].
^{8} In Brazil and Angola, the consonant hereafter, denoted as /ɲ/, is realized as a nasal palatal approximant [j̃], which nasalizes the vowel that precedes it: ninho ([ˈnĩj̃u] 'nest'.
^{9} The written tilde (ã ẽ ĩ õ ũ ỹ in the medieval sources) can be analyzed as a nasal consonant phoneme (usually /ŋ/, sometimes /ɲ/ depending on position) following the marked vowel, with any nasalization of the vowel being a phonetic secondary effect.

Oral vowel phonemes
	Front	Central	Back
Close	i		u
Close-mid	e		o
Open-mid	ɛ		ɔ
Open		a	

Nasal vowel allophones
	Front	Central	Back
Close	ĩ		ũ
Close-mid	ẽ		õ
Open-mid	ɛ̃		ɔ̃
Open-mid		ã	

As far as it is known, Galician–Portuguese (from the 11th to 16th centuries) had a 7-vowel system (/a, e, ɛ, i, o, ɔ, u/), just like in most Romance languages. When nasalized in contact with syllable-final nasal consonants /n, ŋ, ɲ/, the vowels became /ã, ẽ, ɛ̃, ĩ, õ, ɔ̃, ũ/. The vowels /e – ɛ, o – ɔ/ were raised to /e, o/ in unstressed syllables, even in final syllables (like in modern Spanish); e.g. vento [ˈvẽnto], quente [ˈkɛ̃nte].

However, the /a – ɐ/ distribution is still dubious and under discussion; some either stating that these two vowels were allophones and in complementary distribution (like in Modern Galician, Brazilian Portuguese and Spanish): Alamanha [alaˈmaɲa] (in Brazilian Portuguese: Alemanha [aleˈmɐ̃j̃ɐ]), mannãa [maˈɲãŋa] (in Brazilian Portuguese: manhã [mɐ̃ˈj̃ɐ̃]); or stating they were not allophones and under distribution like in modern European Portuguese, Alemanha [ɐlɨˈmɐɲɐ], manhã [mɐˈɲɐ̃].

== Sample text ==
Here is a sample of Galician-Portuguese lyric:

Proençaes soen mui ben trobar
e dizen eles que é con amor,
mays os que troban no tempo da frol
e non-en outro, sei eu ben que non
an tan gran coita no seu coraçon
qual m' eu por mha senhor vejo levar

— King Dinis of Portugal (1271–1325)
Translation:

Provençal [poets] tend to compose very well
and they say it is out of love,
but those who compose when flowers bloom
and at no other time, I know well that they don't
have in their hearts so great a yearning
as I must carry for my Lady in mine.

== Oral traditions ==
There has been a sharing of folklore in the Galician–Portuguese region going back to prehistoric times. As the Galician–Portuguese language spread south with the Reconquista, supplanting Mozarabic, this ancient sharing of folklore intensified. In 2005, the governments of Portugal and Spain jointly proposed that Galician–Portuguese oral traditions be made part of the Masterpiece of Oral and Intangible Heritage of Humanity. The work of documenting and transmitting that common culture involves several universities and other organizations.

Galician–Portuguese folklore is rich in oral traditions. These include the cantigas ao desafio or regueifas, duels of improvised songs, many legends, stories, poems, romances, folk songs, sayings and riddles, and ways of speech that still retain a lexical, phonetic, morphological and syntactic similarity.

Also part of the common heritage of oral traditions are the markets and festivals of patron saints and processions, religious celebrations such as the magosto, entroido or Corpus Christi, with ancient dances and tradition – like the one where Coca the dragon fights with Saint George; and also traditional clothing and adornments, crafts and skills, work-tools, carved vegetable lanterns, superstitions, traditional knowledge about plants and animals. All these are part of a common heritage considered in danger of extinction as the traditional way of living is replaced by modern life, and the jargon of fisherman, the names of tools in traditional crafts, and the oral traditions which form part of celebrations are slowly forgotten.

A Galician–Portuguese "baixo-limiao" tongue is spoken in several villages. In Galicia, it is spoken in Entrimo and Lobios and in northern Portugal in Terras de Bouro (lands of the Buri) and Castro Laboreiro including the mountain town (county seat) of Soajo and surrounding villages.

== See also ==
About the Galician–Portuguese languages

- Cantiga de amigo
- Galician-Asturian
- Fala language
- Galician language
- History of Portuguese
- Portuguese language
- Reintegrationism

About Galician–Portuguese culture

- Culture of Portugal
- Lusitanian mythology
- Galician culture

== Bibliography ==
Manuscripts containing Galician–Portuguese ('secular') lyric (cited from Cohen 2003 [see below under critical editions]):

- A = "Cancioneiro da Ajuda", Palácio Real da Ajuda (Lisbon).
- B = Biblioteca Nacional (Lisbon), cod. 10991.
- Ba = Bancroft Library (University of California, Berkeley) 2 MS DP3 F3 (MS UCB 143)
- N = Morgan Library & Museum (New York), MS 979 (= PV).
- S = Arquivo Nacional da Torre do Tombo (Lisbon), Capa do Cart. Not. de Lisboa, N.º 7-A, Caixa 1, Maço 1, Livro 3.
- V = Biblioteca Apostolica Vaticana, cod. lat. 4803.
- Va = Biblioteca Apostolica Vaticana, cod. lat. 7182, ff. 276rº – 278rº

Manuscripts containing the Cantigas de Santa Maria:

- E = Real Monasterio de San Lorenzo (El Escorial), MS B. I. 2.
- F = Biblioteca Nazionale Centrale (Florence), Banco Rari 20.
- T = Real Monasterio de San Lorenzo (El Escorial), MS T. I. 1.
- To = Biblioteca Nacional (Madrid), cod. 10.069 ("El Toledano")

Critical editions of individual genres of Galician–Portuguese poetry (note that the cantigas d'amor are split between Michaëlis 1904 and Nunes 1932):

- Cohen, Rip. (2003). 500 Cantigas d' Amigo: Edição Crítica / Critical Edition (Porto: Campo das Letras).
- Lapa, Manuel Rodrigues (1970). Cantigas d'escarnho e de mal dizer dos cancioneiros medievais galego-portugueses. Edição crítica pelo prof. –. 2nd ed. Vigo: Editorial Galaxia [1st. ed. Coimbra, Editorial Galaxia, 1965] with "Vocabulário").
- Mettmann, Walter. (1959–1972). Afonso X, o Sabio. Cantigas de Santa Maria. 4 vols ["Glossário", in vol. 4]. Coimbra: Por ordem da Universidade (republished in 2 vols. ["Glossário" in vol. 2] Vigo: Edicións Xerais de Galicia, 1981; 2nd ed.: Alfonso X, el Sabio, Cantigas de Santa Maria, Edición, introducción y notas de –. 3 vols. Madrid: Clásicos Castália, 1986–1989).
- Michaëlis de Vasconcellos, Carolina. (1904). Cancioneiro da Ajuda. Edição critica e commentada por –. 2 vols. Halle a.S., Max Niemeyer (republished Lisboa: Imprensa Nacional – Casa de Moeda, 1990).
- Nunes, José Joaquim. (1932). Cantigas d'amor dos trovadores galego-portugueses. Edição crítica acompanhada de introdução, comentário, variantes, e glossário por –. Coimbra: Imprensa da Universidade (Biblioteca de escritores portugueses) (republished by Lisboa: Centro do Livro Brasileiro, 1972).

On the biography and chronology of the poets and the courts they frequented, the relation of these matters to the internal structure of the manuscript tradition, and myriad relevant questions in the field, please see:

- Oliveira, António Resende de (1987). "A cultura trovadoresca no ocidente peninsular: trovadores e jograis galegos", Biblos LXIII: 1–22.
- ——— (1988). "Do Cancioneiro da Ajuda ao Livro das Cantigas do Conde D. Pedro. Análise do acrescento à secção das cantigas de amigo de O", Revista de História das Ideias 10: 691–751.
- ——— (1989). "A Galiza e a cultura trovadoresca peninsular", Revista de História das Ideias 11: 7–36.
- ——— (1993). "A caminho de Galiza. Sobre as primeiras composições em galego-português", in O Cantar dos Trobadores. Santiago de Compostela: Xunta de Galicia, pp. 249–260 (republished in Oliveira 2001b: 65–78).
- ——— (1994). Depois do Espectáculo Trovadoresco. a estrutura dos cancioneiros peninsulares e as recolhas dos séculos XIII e XIV. Lisboa: Edições Colibri (Colecção: Autores Portugueses).
- ——— (1995). Trobadores e Xograres. Contexto histórico. (tr. Valentín Arias) Vigo: Edicións Xerais de Galicia (Universitaria / Historia crítica da literatura medieval).
- ——— (1997a). "Arqueologia do mecenato trovadoresco em Portugal", in Actas do 2º Congresso Histórico de Guimarães, 319–327 (republished in Oliveira 2001b: 51–62).
- ——— (1997b). "História de uma despossessão. A nobreza e os primeiros textos em galego-português", in Revista de História das Ideias 19: 105–136.
- ——— (1998a). "Le surgissement de la culture troubadouresque dans l'occident de la Péninsule Ibérique (I). Compositeurs et cours", in (Anton Touber, ed.) Le Rayonnement des Troubadours, Amsterdam, pp. 85–95 (Internationale Forschungen zur allgemeinen und vergleichenden Literaturwissenschaft) (Port. version in Oliveira 2001b: 141–170).
- ——— (1998b). "Galicia trobadoresca", in Anuario de Estudios Literarios Galegos 1998: 207–229 (Port. Version in Oliveira 2001b: 97–110).
- ——— (2001a). Aventures i Desventures del Joglar Gallegoportouguès (tr. Jordi Cerdà). Barcelona: Columna (La Flor Inversa, 6).
- ——— (2001b). O Trovador galego-português e o seu mundo. Lisboa: Notícias Editorial (Colecção Poliedro da História).

For Galician–Portuguese prose, the reader might begin with:

- Cintra, Luís F. Lindley. (1951–1990). Crónica Geral de Espanha de 1344. Edição crítica do texto português pelo –. Lisboa: Imprensa Nacional-Casa de Moeda (vol. I 1951 [1952; reprint 1983]; vol II 1954 [republished 1984]; vol. III 1961 [republished 1984], vol. IV 1990) (Academia Portuguesa da História. Fontes Narrativas da História Portuguesa).
- Lorenzo, Ramón. (1977). La traduccion gallego de la Cronica General y de la Cronica de Castilla. Edición crítica anotada, con introduccion, índice onomástico e glosario. 2 vols. Orense: Instituto de Estudios Orensanos 'Padre Feijoo'.

There is no up-to-date historical grammar of medieval Galician–Portuguese. But see:

- Huber, Joseph. (1933). Altportugiesisches Elementarbuch. Heidelberg: Carl Winter (Sammlung romanischer Elementar- und Händbucher, I, 8) (Port tr. [by Maria Manuela Gouveia Delille] Gramática do Português Antigo. Lisboa: Fundação Calouste Gulbenkian, 1986).

A recent work centered on Galician containing information on medieval Galician–Portuguese is:

- Ferreiro, Manuel. (2001). Gramática Histórica Galega, 2 vols. [2nd ed.], Santiago de Compostela: Laiovento.
- An old reference work centered on Portuguese is:
- Williams, Edwin B. (1962). From Latin to Portuguese. 2nd ed. Philadelphia: University of Pennsylvania Press (1st ed. Philadelphia, 1938). (1938 ed. on HathiTrust, 1962 ed. on HathiTrust)

Latin Lexica:

- Mediae Latinitatis Lexicon Minus. Lexique Latin Médiévale-Francais/Anglais. A Medieval Latin-French/English Dictionary. composuit J. F. Niermeyer, perficiendum curavit C. van de Kieft. Abbreviationes et index fontium composuit C. van de Kieft, adiuvante G. S. M. M. Lake-Schoonebeek. Leiden – New York – Köln: E. J. Brill 1993 (1st ed. 1976).
- Oxford Latin Dictionary. ed. P. G. W. Glare. Oxford: Clarendon Press 1983.

Historical and Comparative Grammar of Latin:

- Weiss, Michael. (2009). Outline of the Historical and Comparative Grammar of Latin. Ann Arbor, MI: Beechstave Press.

On the early documents cited from the late 12th century, please see Ivo Castro, Introdução à História do Português. Geografia da Língua. Português Antigo. (Lisbon: Colibri, 2004), pp. 121–125 (with references).
