= Cancioneiro da Biblioteca Nacional =

Compilation of Galician-Portuguese lyrics

Cancioneiro Colocci-Brancuti

The Cancioneiro da Biblioteca Nacional (Portuguese: [kɐ̃sjuˈnɐjɾu ðɐ βiβliuˈtɛkɐ nɐsjuˈnal], Galician: [kanθjoˈnejɾʊ ðɐ βiβljoˈtɛkɐ naθjoˈnal]; "The National Library Songbook"), commonly called Colocci-Brancuti, is a compilation of Galician-Portuguese lyrics by both troubadours and jograes (non-noble performers and composers) . These cantigas (songs) are classified, following indications in the poems themselves and in the manuscript tradition, into three main genres: cantigas de amigo (female-voiced love songs, about a boyfriend), cantigas de amor (male-voiced love songs) and cantigas de escárnio e mal-dizer (songs of mockery and insult).

The poems were copied in Italy (presumably from a manuscript from Portugal or Spain) around 1525-1526 by the order of humanist Angelo Colocci (1467-1549), who numbered all the songs, made an index (commonly called the Tavola Colocciana [Colocci's table]), and annotated the codex. In the 19th century the cancioneiro belonged to Count Paolo Brancuti di Cagli, from Ancona, in whose private library it was discovered in 1878. The count later sold the manuscript to Italian philologist Ernesto Monaci, who left it to his heirs on the condition that it not leave Italy. Nevertheless, the manuscript was acquired by the Portuguese government in 1924 and since then has been in the holdings of the Portuguese National Library in Lisbon. A closely related songbook (sister or cousin), kept in the Vatican Library, is called the Cancioneiro da Vaticana.

The Cancioneiro was copied by six different hands, according to the most recent analysis, using both gothic and cursive scripts. Of the original 1664 songs only 1560 remain. Some of the composers found in it are King Dinis of Portugal, D. Sancho I, D. Pedro, count of Barcelos, Pay Soares de Taveirós, Johan Garcia de Guilhade, Johan Airas de Santiago, Airas Nunes, Martin Codax. All told there are about 160 poets.

== See also ==
- Galician-Portuguese lyric
