= Cancioneiro da Ajuda =

Songbook written in the Galician-Portuguese language from the 13th century

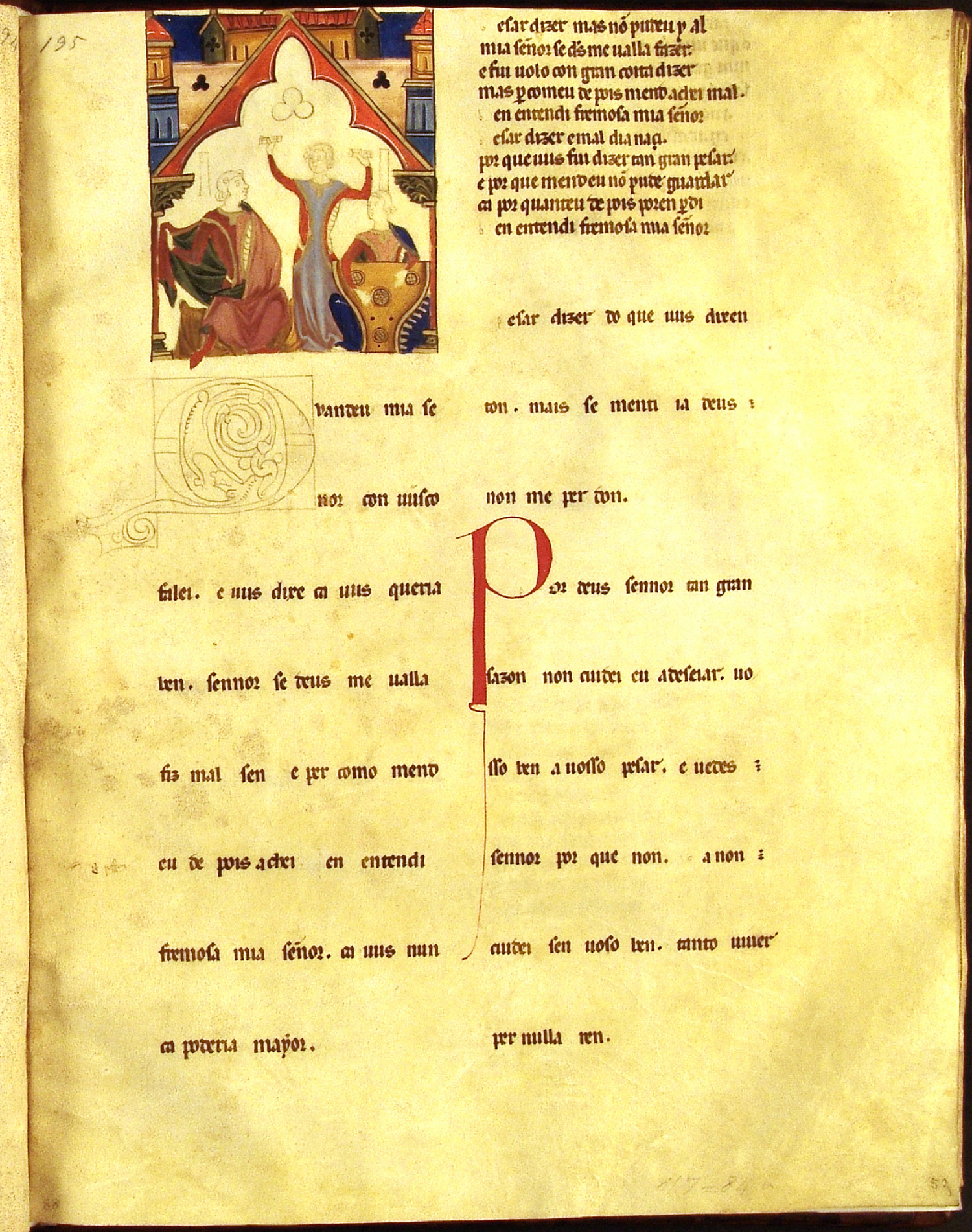
The colouring of the musicians in the miniature was left incomplete.

Ajuda National Palace, in Lisbon, where the manuscript is kept

The Cancioneiro da Ajuda (Portuguese pronunciation: [kɐ̃sjuˈnɐjɾu ðaˈʒuðɐ], Galician: [kanθjoˈnejɾʊ ð(ɐ) aˈʃuðɐ]; "Ajuda Songbook") is a collection of Galician-Portuguese lyric poems probably dating from the last quarter of the 13th century. It is the oldest of the Galician-Portuguese cancioneiros with secular music.

== Description ==
The Cancioneiro is kept in the library of the Ajuda National Palace, a former royal residence located in Lisbon. It consists of a parchment codex written in Gothic script by three hands and containing illuminated miniatures. Both the text and the miniatures remained unfinished and not a note of music was written in the space left for it. The whole codex contains 310 poems, nearly all of them cantigas de amor (male-voiced love songs, though a few are satiric and there are a few male/female dialogs).

== History ==
The first (crude) edition dates from 1823, but a monumental critical edition, still a standard work, was published by the German-born Romance philologist Carolina Michaëlis de Vasconcellos in 1904. An important paleographic transcription was published by American scholar Henry H. Carter in 1941.
