= Cantiga de amor =

Genre of the Galician-Portuguese lyric

Cantiga de amor (Portuguese and Galician) or cantiga d'amor (Galician-Portuguese)—literally "love song"—is a genre of male-voiced lyric poem from the Middle Ages. It was one of the main genres of the Galician-Portuguese lyric. Its origin can be traced back to Occitan canso, although it was heavily influenced by foreign traditions.

The cantiga de amor belongs to what is conventionally known as the "courtly love" tradition. The servidor (servant) declares his love for an unnamed senhor (lady) and describes his coita (suffering) from its being unfulfilled. Compared the Occitan canso, the cantiga is shorter and usually has a refrain.

== See also ==
- Cantiga de amigo
- Cantigas de escárnio e maldizer
