= Lexicon of Galiza =

Dictionary of Galician terms to reintegrate into Portuguese

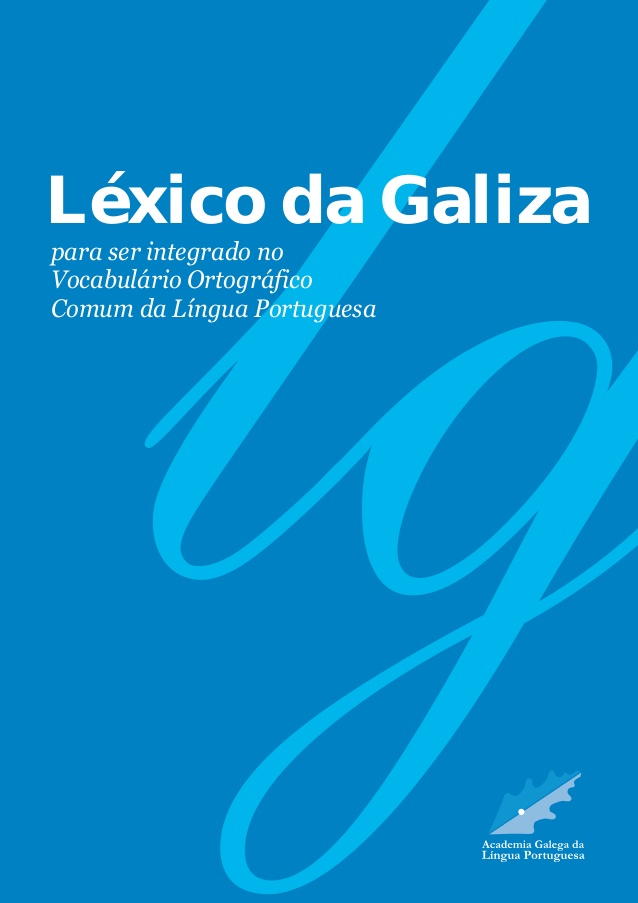

The Lexicon of Galicia (Léxico da Galiza) is a contribution from the Galician Academy of the Portuguese Language (Academia Galega da Língua Portuguesa AGLP) of more than 800 words characteristic of Galician to the dictionaries of Portuguese, to be incorporated into the common lexicon of the Orthographic Agreement. It was presented at a joint ceremony with the academies of Portugal and Brazil on April 14, 2009. The first dictionary of Portuguese to include it was that of Porto Editora in October 2009.

== See also ==
- Galician Academy of the Portuguese Language
- Reintegrationism
