= Galician language =

Western Ibero-Romance language

Galician
- galego
- Pronunciation: [ɡaˈleɣʊ]
- Region: Galicia and adjacent areas in Asturias and Castile and León
- Ethnicity: Galician
- Native speakers: 2.4 million (2012); 58% of the population of Galicia (c. 1.56 million) are L1 speakers (2007)
- Language family: Indo-European: Italic; Latino-Faliscan; Latin; Romance; Italo-Western; Western Romance; Ibero-Romance; West Iberian; Galician-Portuguese; Galician
- Early forms: Old Latin: Vulgar Latin; Proto-Romance; Galician-Portuguese; Middle Galician
- Writing system: Latin (Galician alphabet); Galician Braille

Official status
- Official language in: Spain: Galicia
- Recognised minority language in: El Bierzo (Castile and León, Spain)
- Regulated by: Royal Galician Academy, Galician Language Association

Language codes
- ISO 639-1: gl
- ISO 639-2: glg
- ISO 639-3: glg
- Glottolog: gali1258
- Linguasphere: 51-AAA-ab
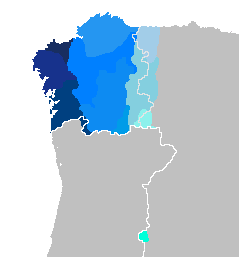
Distribution of the various dialects of Galician in Spain and the extreme north of Portugal
Western Areas
Bergantiños
Fisterra
Pontevedra
Central Areas
Mindoniensis
Central Transitional
Lucu-Auriensis
Eastern Transitional
Eastern Areas
Asturian
Central Western
Zamora
Other Areas
Fala language

Galician (/ɡəˈlɪʃ(i)ən/ gə-LISH-(ee-)ən, UK also /ɡəˈlɪsiən/ gə-LISS-ee-ən), also known as Galego (endonym: galego), is a Western Ibero-Romance language. Around 2.4 million people have at least some degree of competence in the language, mainly in Galicia, an autonomous community located in northwestern Spain, where it has official status along with Spanish. The language is also spoken in some border zones of the neighbouring Spanish regions of Asturias and Castile and León, as well as by Galician migrant communities in the rest of Spain; in Latin America, including Argentina and Uruguay; and in Puerto Rico, the United States, Switzerland and elsewhere in Europe.

Modern Galician is classified as part of the West Iberian language group, a family of Romance languages. Galician evolved locally from Vulgar Latin and developed from what modern scholars have called Galician-Portuguese. The earliest document written integrally in the local Galician variety dates back to 1230, although the subjacent Romance permeates most written Latin local charters after the High Middle Ages, being especially noteworthy in personal and place names recorded in those documents, as well as in terms originated in languages other than Latin. The earliest reference to Galician-Portuguese as an international language of culture dates to 1290, in the Regles de Trobar by Catalan author Jofre de Foixà, where it is simply called Galician (gallego).

Dialectal divergences are observable between the northern and southern forms of Galician-Portuguese in 13th-century texts, but the two dialects were similar enough to maintain a high level of cultural unity until the middle of the 14th century, producing the medieval Galician-Portuguese lyric. The divergence has continued to this day, most frequently due to innovations in Portuguese, producing the modern languages of Galician and Portuguese. The lexicon of Galician is predominantly of Latin extraction, although it also contains a moderate number of words of Germanic and Celtic origin, among other substrates and adstrates, having also received, mainly via Spanish, a number of nouns from Andalusian Arabic.

The language is officially regulated in Galicia by the Royal Galician Academy. Other organizations, without institutional support, such as the Galician Language Association, consider Galician and Portuguese two forms of the Galician-Portuguese language.

== Classification and relation with Portuguese ==
Map showing the historical retreat and expansion of Galician (Galician and Portuguese) within the context of its linguistic neighbors between the year 1000 and 2000

Modern Galician and Portuguese originated from a common medieval ancestor designated variously by modern linguists as Galician-Portuguese (or as Medieval Galician, Medieval Portuguese, Old Galician or Old Portuguese). This common ancestral stage developed from Vulgar Latin in the territories of the old Kingdom of Galicia, Galicia and Northern Portugal, as a Western Romance language. In the 13th century, it became a written and cultivated language with two main varieties, but during the 14th century the standards of these varieties, Galician and Portuguese, began to diverge, as Portuguese became the official language of the independent Kingdom of Portugal and its chancellery, while Galician was the language of the scriptoria of the lawyers, noblemen and churchmen of the Kingdom of Galicia, then integrated in the crown of Castile and open to influence from Spanish language, culture, and politics. During the 16th century, the Galician language stopped being used in legal documentation, becoming de facto an oral language spoken by the vast majority of the Galicians, but having only minor written use in lyric, theatre, and private letters.

It was not until the 18th century that linguists elaborated the first Galician dictionaries, and the language did not recover a proper literature until the 19th century; only since the last quarter of the 20th century has it been taught in schools and used in lawmaking. The first complete translation of the Bible from the original languages dates from 1989. Currently, at the level of rural dialects, Galician forms a dialect continuum with Portuguese in the south, and with Astur-Leonese in the east. Mutual intelligibility (estimated at 85% by Robert A. Hall Jr., 1989) is very high between Galicians and northern Portuguese.

Statute of Galicia, 1936

The current linguistic status of Galician with regard to Portuguese is controversial in Galicia, and the issue sometimes carries political overtones. There are linguists who regard Galician and Portuguese as two standard varieties of the same language. Some authors, such as Lindley Cintra, consider that they are still co-dialects of a common language in spite of differences in phonology and vocabulary, while others argue that they have become separate languages due to differences in phonetics and vocabulary usage, and, to a lesser extent, morphology and syntax. Fernández Rei in 1990 stated that the Galician language is, with respect to Portuguese, an ausbau language, a language through elaboration, and not an abstand language, a language through detachment.

With regard to the external and internal perception of this relation, for instance in past editions of the Encyclopædia Britannica, Galician was defined as a "Portuguese dialect" spoken in northwestern Spain. On the other hand, the director of the Instituto Camões declared in 2019 that Galician and Portuguese were close kin but different languages. According to the Galician government, universities and main cultural institutions, such as the Galician Language Institute or the Royal Galician Academy, Galician and Portuguese are independent languages that stemmed from medieval Galician-Portuguese, and modern Galician must be considered an independent Romance language belonging to the group of Ibero-Romance languages having strong ties with Portuguese and its northern dialects. The standard orthography has its roots in the writing of relatively modern Rexurdimento authors, who largely adapted Spanish orthography to the then mostly unwritten language. Most Galician speakers regard Galician as a separate language, which evolved without interruption and in situ from Latin, with Galician and Portuguese maintaining separate literary traditions since the 14th century.

Portuguese Early Modern Era grammars and scholars, at least since Duarte Nunes de Leão in 1606, considered Portuguese and Galician two different languages derived from Old Galician, understood as the language spoken in the Northwest before the establishment of the Kingdom of Portugal in the 12th century. The surge of the two languages would be a result of both the elaboration of Portuguese, through the royal court, its internationalization and its study and culture; and of the stagnation of Galician.

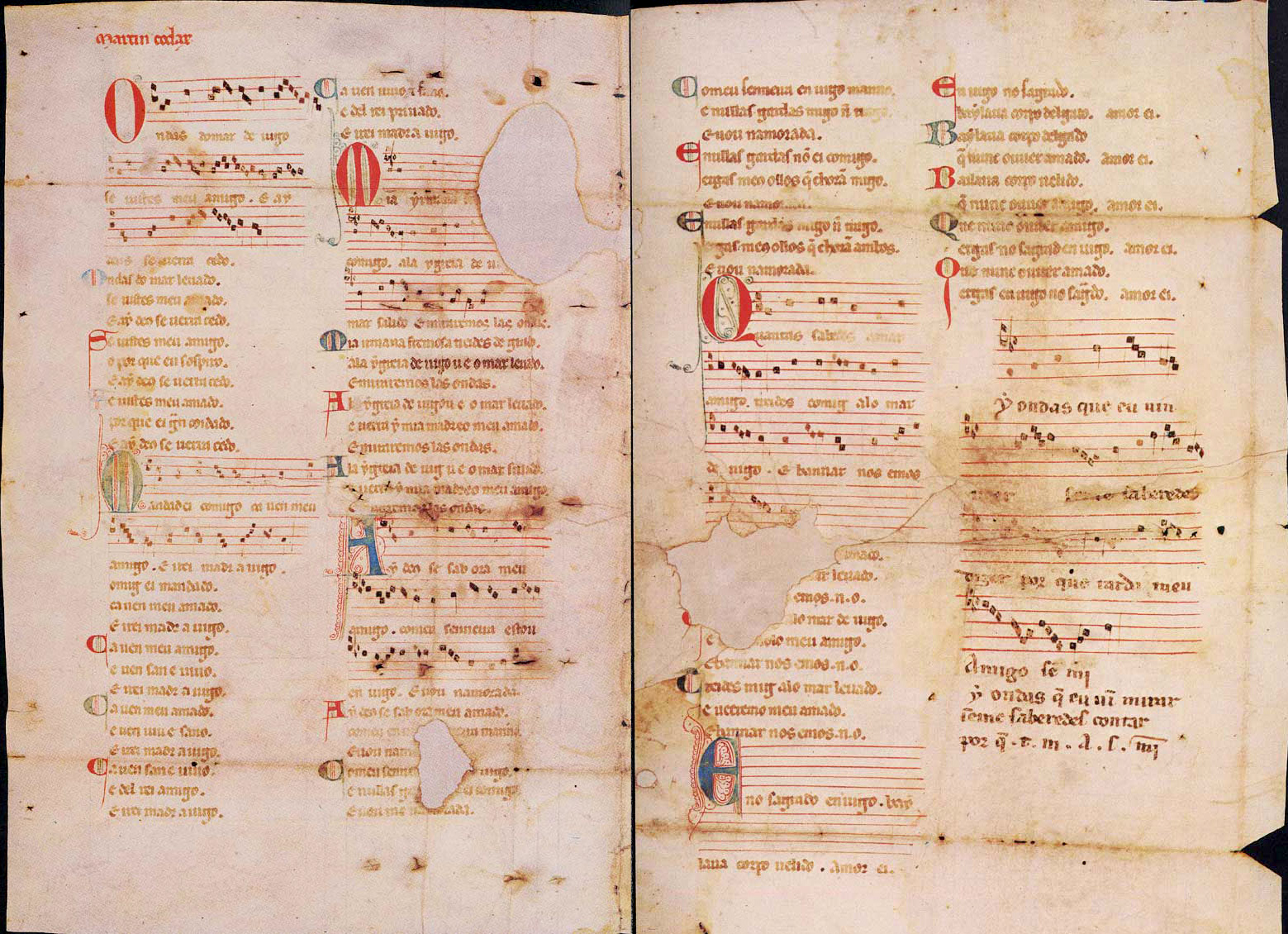
Vindel's parchment, containing music and lyrics of several 13th-century cantigas by Martin Codax

The earliest internal attestation of the expression Galician language ("lingoajen galego") dates from the 14th century. In Spanish "lenguaje gallego" is already documented in this same century, circa 1330; in Occitan circa 1290, in the Regles de Trobar by Catalan author Jofre de Foixà: "si tu vols far un cantar en frances, no·s tayn que·y mescles proençal ne cicilia ne gallego ne altre lengatge que sia strayn a aquell" [If you want to compose a song in French, you should not admix Provençal nor Sicilian nor Galician nor other language which is different from it].

=== Reintegrationism and political implications ===
Private cultural associations, not endorsed by Galician or Portuguese governments, such as the Galician Language Association (Associaçom Galega da Língua) and Galician Academy of the Portuguese Language (Academia Galega da Língua Portuguesa), advocates of the minority Reintegrationist movement, support the idea that differences between Galician and Portuguese speech are not enough to justify regarding them as separate languages: Galician would be simply one variety of Galician-Portuguese, along with European Portuguese; Brazilian Portuguese; African Portuguese; the Fala language spoken in the northwestern corner of Extremadura (Spain); and other dialects. They have adopted slightly modified or actual Portuguese orthography, which has its roots in medieval Galician-Portuguese poetry as later adapted by the Portuguese Chancellery.

According to Reintegrationists, treating Galician as an independent language reduces contact with Portuguese culture, leaving Galician as a minor language with less capacity to counterbalance the influence of Spanish, the only official language between the 18th century and 1975. On the other hand, viewing Galician as a part of the Lusosphere, while not denying its own characteristics (cf. Swiss German), shifts cultural influence from the Spanish domain to the Portuguese. Some scholars have described the situation as properly a continuum, from the Galician variants of Portuguese in one extreme to the Spanish language in the other (which would represent the complete linguistic shift from Galician to Spanish); reintegrationist points of view are closer to the Portuguese extreme, and so-called isolationist ones would be closer to the Spanish one; however, the major Galician nationalist parties, Anova–Nationalist Brotherhood and Galician Nationalist Bloc, do not use reintegrationist orthographical conventions.

=== Official relations between Galicia and the Lusophony ===
In 2014, the parliament of Galicia unanimously approved Law 1/2014 regarding the promotion of the Portuguese language and links with the Lusophony. Similarly, on 20 October 2016, the city of Santiago de Compostela, the capital of Galicia, approved by unanimity a proposal to become an observer member of the Union of Portuguese-Speaking Capitals (UCCLA). Also, on 1 November 2016, the Council of Galician Culture (Consello da Cultura Galega, an official institution of defence and promotion of the Galician culture and language), was admitted as a consultative observer of the Community of Portuguese Language Countries (CPLP). After that, three more Galician entities have been admitted as consultative observers as well: Galician Academy of the Portuguese Language, Docentes de Português na Galiza and Galician Language Association.

A "friendship and cooperation" protocol was signed between the Royal Galician Academy (RAG) and the Brazilian Academy of Letters on 10 January 2019. Víctor F. Freixanes, president of the RAG, stated during the ceremony that "there is a conscience that the Galician language is part of a family which includes our brothers from Portugal, Brazil, Angola, Cape Verde, Mozambique... a territory full of possibilities also for Galician. We always said that Galician is not a regional language, but is in fact part of that international project".

== Geographic distribution and legal status ==
Galician is spoken by some three million people, including most of the population of Galicia and the numerous Galician communities established elsewhere, in Spain (Madrid, Barcelona, Biscay), in other European cities (Andorra la Vella, Geneva, London, Paris), and in the Americas (New York, New Jersey, Buenos Aires, Córdoba/Argentina, Montevideo, Mexico City, Havana, Caracas, San Juan in Puerto Rico, São Paulo, Managua, Mayagüez, Ponce, Panama City).

Galician is today official, together with the Spanish language, in the autonomous community of Galicia, where it is recognised as the autochthonous language (lingua propia), being by law the first language of the local administrations and governments. By law it is supposed to be taught bilingually, alongside Spanish, in both primary and secondary education, although the accomplishment of this law is allegedly doubted. It is also used at the three universities established in Galicia, having also the consideration of official language of the three institutions. Galician has also legal recognition in the Bierzo region in León, and in four municipalities in Zamora. The other languages with official status elsewhere in Spain are Spanish, Catalan (or Valencian), Basque and Aranese. Galician has also been accepted orally as Portuguese in the European Parliament, being used by some Galician representatives, among others: José Posada, Camilo Nogueira and Xosé Manuel Beiras.

Controversy exists regarding the inclusion of Eonavian (spoken in the western end of Asturias, bordering Galicia) in the Galician language, as it has some traits in common with Western Asturian (spoken in the middle west of Asturias). There are those defending these linguistic varieties as dialects of transition to the Astur-Leonese group on the one hand, and those defending it as clearly Galician varieties on the other (actually both views are compatible). The recent edition of the cartularies of Oscos in the Old Common Council of Castropol and cartularies of Obona, Cornellana, Corias and Belmonte in middle west of Asturias have shown a huge difference in the medieval speech between the two banks of the Navia river. An examination of the old documents of the Eonavian monastery of Oscos, written from the late 12th to early 14th century to 16th century, shows a clear identification of this language with the Galician-Portuguese linguistic group; while contemporary parchments elsewhere in Asturias are written in Spanish. The two most important traits of those commonly used to tell apart Galician-Portuguese and Asturian-Leonese varieties are the preservation of the mid-open vowels /ɛ/ and /ɔ/, which became diphthongs in Asturian-Leonese, and the loss of intervocalic /n/, preserved in the latter language.

== History ==
Excerpt of medieval Galician poetry (with English translation)

Porque no mundo mengou a verdade,
punhei um dia de a ir buscar;
e, u por ela fui nom preguntar,
disserom todos: «Alhur la buscade,
ca de tal guisa se foi a perder,
que nom podemos en novas haver
nem já nom anda na irmaindade.»

Because in the world the truth has faded,
I decided to go a-searching for it
and wherever I went asking for it
everybody said: 'Search elsewhere
because truth is lost in such a way
such as we can have no news of it
nor is it around here anymore.'

— Airas Nunes (B 871, V 455. 13th century)

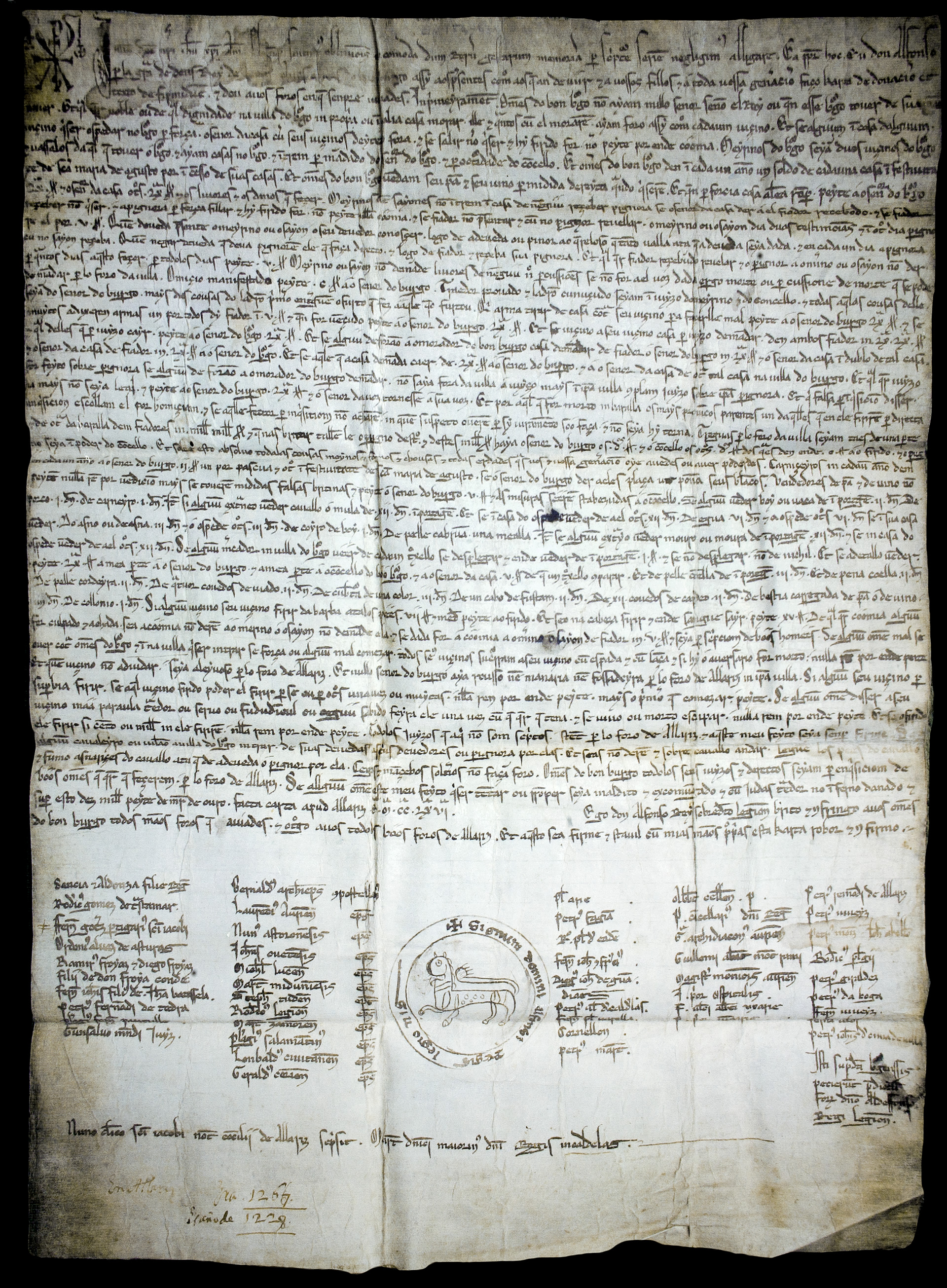
One of the oldest legal charters written in Galician, the constitutional charter of the Bo Burgo (Good Burg) of Castro Caldelas, 1228

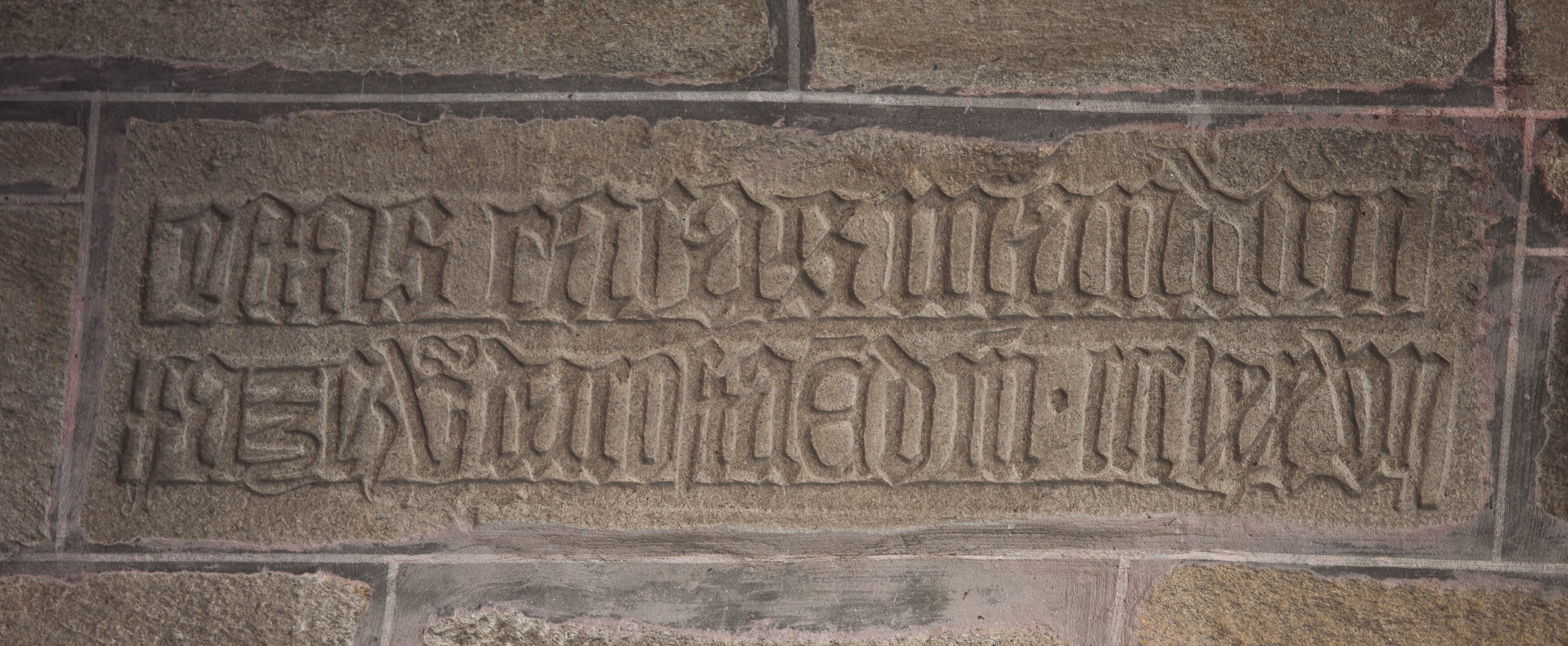
Mediaeval Galician inscription in a 14th-century house, in Noia: "ESTAS CASAS MANDOU FAZER VASCO DA COSTA, ERA DE MCCCLXXVII" These houses were ordered by Vasco da Costa, era 1377 (1339 AD)

Latinate Galician charters from the 8th century onward show that the local written Latin was heavily influenced by local spoken Romance, yet is not until the 12th century that there is evidence for the identification of the local language as a language different from Latin itself. During this same 12th century there are full Galician sentences being inadvertently used inside Latin texts, while its first reckoned use as a literary language dates to the last years of this same century.

The linguistic stage from the 13th to the 15th centuries is usually known as Galician-Portuguese (or Old Portuguese, or Old Galician) as an acknowledgement of the cultural and linguistic unity of Galicia and Portugal during the Middle Ages, as the two linguistic varieties differed only in dialectal minor phenomena.

This language flourished during the 13th and 14th centuries as a language of culture, developing a rich lyric tradition of which some 2000 compositions (cantigas, meaning 'songs') have been preserved—a few hundred even with their musical score—in a series of collections, and belonging to four main genres: cantigas de amor, love songs, where a man sings for his ladylove; cantigas de amigo, where a woman sings for her boyfriend; cantigas de escarnio, crude, taunting, and sexual songs of scorn; cantigas de maldecir, where the poet vents his spleen openly; and also the Cantigas de Santa María, which are religious songs.

The oldest known document is the poem Ora faz ost'o Senhor de Navarra by Joam Soares de Paiva, written around 1200. The first non-literary documents in Galician-Portuguese date from the early 13th century, the Noticia de Torto (1211) and the Testamento of Afonso II of Portugal (1214), both samples of medieval notarial prose.

Its most notable patrons—themselves reputed authors—were King Dom Dinis in Portugal, and King Alfonso X the Learned in Galicia, Castile and León, who was a great promoter of both Galician and Castilian Spanish languages. Not only the kings but also the noble houses of Galicia and Portugal encouraged literary creation in Galician-Portuguese, as being an author or bringing reputed troubadours into one's home became a way of promoting social prestige. As a result, many noblemen, businessmen and clergymen of the 13th and 14th centuries became notable authors, such as Paio Gomes Charinho, lord of Rianxo, and the aforementioned kings.

Aside from the lyric genres, Galicia developed also a minor tradition on literary prose, most notably in translation of European popular series, as those dealing with King Arthur written by Chrétien de Troyes, or those based on the war of Troy, usually paid and commissioned by noblemen who desired to read those romances in their own language. Other genres include history books (either translation of Spanish ones, or original creations like the Chronicle of St. Mary of Iria, by Rui Vasques), religious books, legal studies, and a treaty on horse breeding. Most prose literary creation in Galician had stopped by the 16th century, when printing press became popular; the first complete translation of the Bible was not printed until the 20th century.

As for other written uses of Galician, legal charters (last wills, hirings, sales, constitutional charters, city council book of acts, guild constitutions, books of possessions, and any type of public or private contracts and inventories) written in Galicia are to be found from 1230 to 1530—the earliest one probably a document from the monastery of Melón, dated in 1231—being Galician by far the most used language during the 13th, 14th and 15th centuries, in substitution of Latin.

=== Diglossia and influence of the Spanish language ===
"Santa Maria, strela do dia"
A 13th-century Galician-Portuguese Cantiga

Galician-Portuguese lost its political unity when the County of Portugal obtained its independence from the Kingdom of León, a transition initiated in 1139 and completed in 1179, establishing the Kingdom of Portugal. Meanwhile, the Kingdom of Galicia was united with the Kingdom of León, and later with the Kingdom of Castile, under kings of the House of Burgundy. The Galician and Portuguese standards of the language diverged over time, following independent evolutionary paths. Portuguese was the official language of the Portuguese chancellery, while Galician was the usual language not only of troubadours and peasants, but also of local noblemen and clergy, and of their officials, so forging and maintaining two slightly different standards.

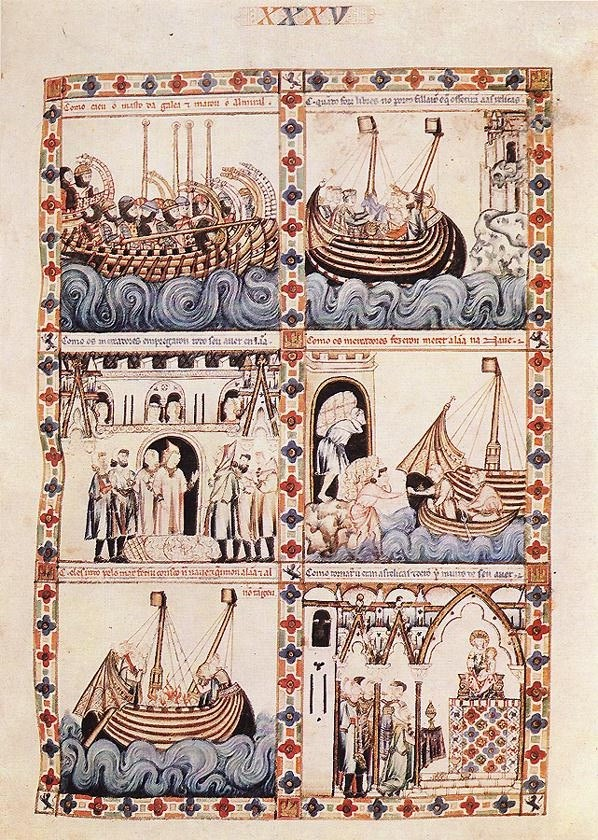
Cantigas de Santa Maria, 13th century

During the reign of Alfonso X, Spanish became the official language of the chancellery of the Kingdom of Castile. However, in Galicia and neighboring regions of Asturias and León in 1200–1500, the local languages remained the usual written languages in any type of document, either legal or narrative, public or private. Spanish was progressively introduced through Royal decrees and the edicts of foreign churchmen and officials. This led, from the late 15th century on, to the end of legal documents in Galician; the last ones were issued around 1530. Also, from 1480 on, notaries of the Crown of Castile were required to obtain their licenses in Toledo, where they had to prove their mastery of Spanish.

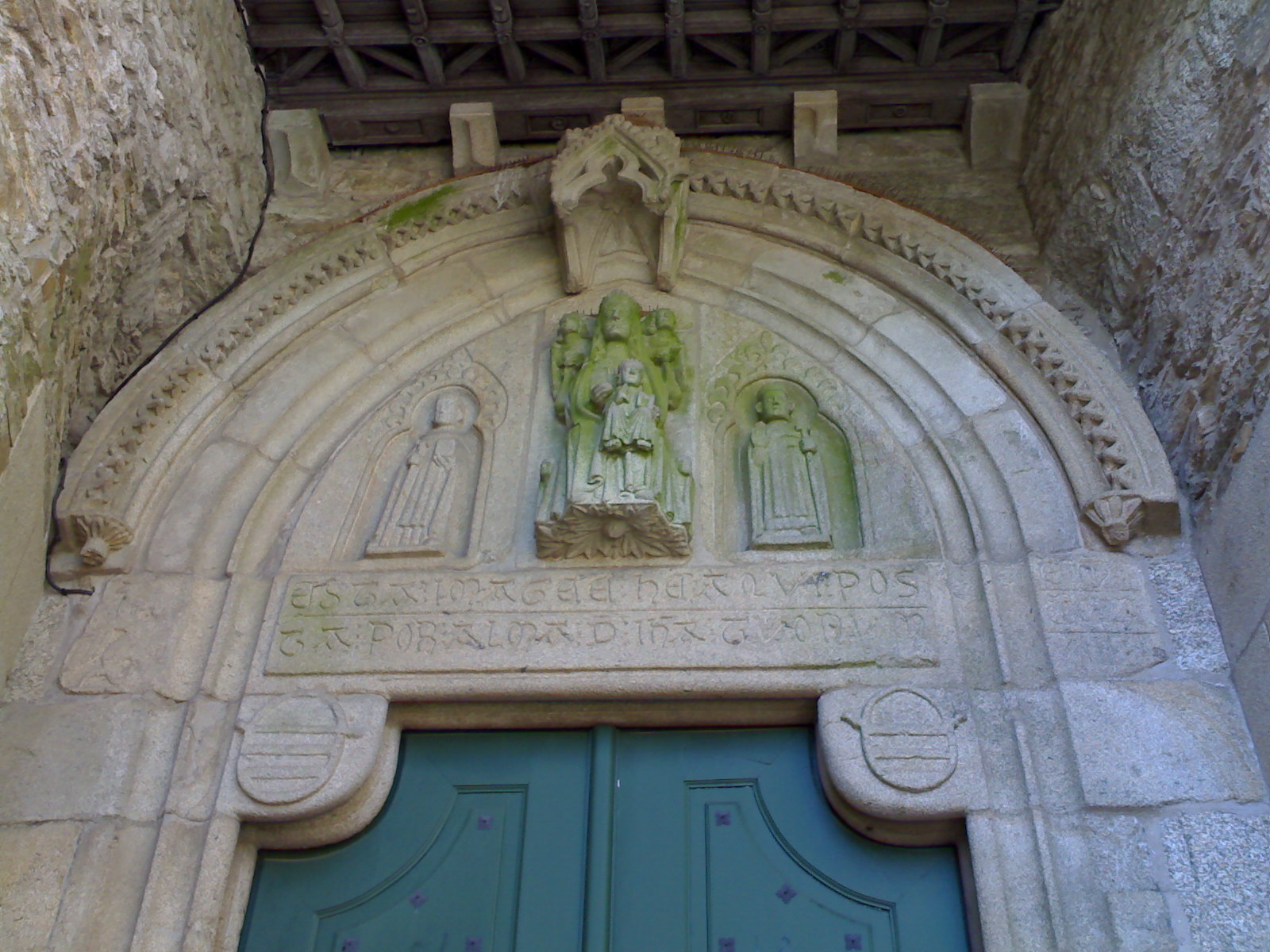
14th-century inscription, in Galician language: 'ESTA : IMAGEE : HE : AQVI : POSTA : POR: ALMA : D(E) : I(O)HA(N) : TVORUM' 'This image is here in exposition for the soul of Joham Tuorum'.

In spite of Galician being the most spoken language, during the 17th century, the elites of the Kingdom began speaking Spanish, most notably in towns and cities. The linguistic situation in Galicia became one of diglossia, with Galician as the low variety and Spanish as the high one. (Note: Although this trend was initially resisted.) In reaction to the relegation of the autochthonous language, a series of literary and historical works (always written in Spanish) appeared in the 17th century through 19th century, meant to vindicate the history, language, people, and culture of Galicia. The period from the 16th century to the early 19th century, when Galician had little literary—and no legal—use, is considered the dark age of Galician language. The Galician spoken and written then is usually referred to as Middle Galician.

=== Middle Galician ===
Middle Galician is known mostly through popular literature (songs, carols, proverbs, theatrical scripts, personal letters), but also through the frequent apparition of Galician interferences and personal and place names in local works and documents otherwise written in Spanish. Other important sources are a number of sonnets and other lyric poetry, as well as other literate productions, including the forgery of allegedly mediaeval scriptures or chronicles under diverse pretensions—usually to show the ancient nobility of the forger's family—being these writings elaborated in an archaic looking Galician which nevertheless could not conceal the state of the language during this period.

Middle Galician is characterised by a series of phonetic processes which led to a further separation from Portuguese, and to the apparition of some of the more noteworthy dialectal features, among other phenomenons: emergence of the gheada or pronunciation of /ɡ/ as a pharyngeal fricative; denasalization of nasal vowels in most of Galicia, becoming oral vowels in the east, or a group formed by an oral vowel plus a nasal consonant in the west; reduction of the sibilant system, with the confluence (except in the Baixa Limia region) of voiced and voiceless fricatives, followed by a process of de-affrication which led to different results in the west and in the east.

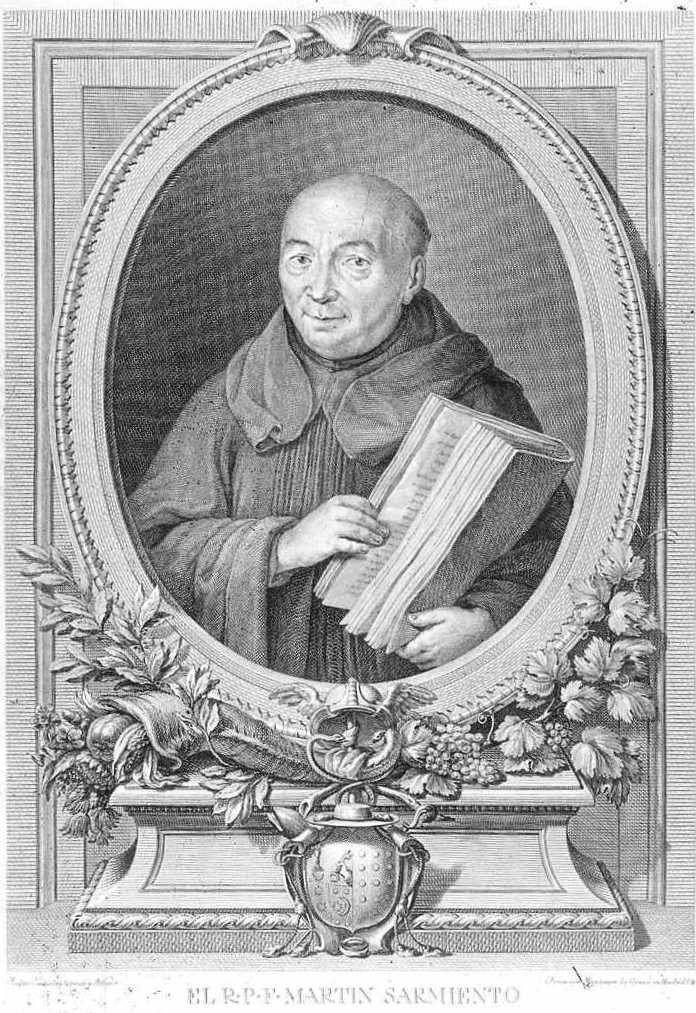
Martín Sarmiento

The most important author during this period of the language was the scholar Martín Sarmiento, unconditional defender and the first researcher of Galician language (history, evolution, lexicon, etymology, onomastics). His Elementos etimológicos segun el método de Euclides (1766), written in Spanish but dealing with Galician, was in fact one of the first comprehensive studies on sound change and evolution of any European language. He also defended that teaching in Galicia should be conducted in Galician, since it was the common language of most people.

=== Rexurdimento (Renaissance) ===
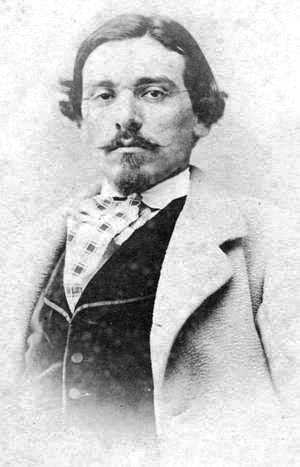
The 19th-century author Eduardo Pondal

During the 19th century a thriving literature developed, in what was called the Rexurdimento (Resurgence), of the Galician language. It was headed by three main authors: Rosalia de Castro, an intimist poet; Eduardo Pondal, of nationalist ideology, who championed a Celtic revival; and Manuel Curros Enríquez, a liberal and anticlerical author whose ideas and proclamations were scandalous for part of the 19th-century society.

The first political manifest asking for the officialization of Galician date to the late 19th century.

An important landmark was the establishment of the Royal Galician Academy, in 1906, soon followed by that of the Seminario de Estudos Galegos (1923). The Seminario was devoted to the research and study of the Galician culture. It was created by a group of students: Fermín Bouza Brey, Xosé Filgueira Valverde, Lois Tobío Fernández, with the collaboration of Ricardo Carvalho Calero, Antón Fraguas and Xaquín Lorenzo Fernández.

Following the victory of Francisco Franco in the Spanish Civil War, the written or public use of the Galician language was outlawed.

Publishing of Galician-language material revived on a small scale in the 1950s.

=== The Galician language today ===
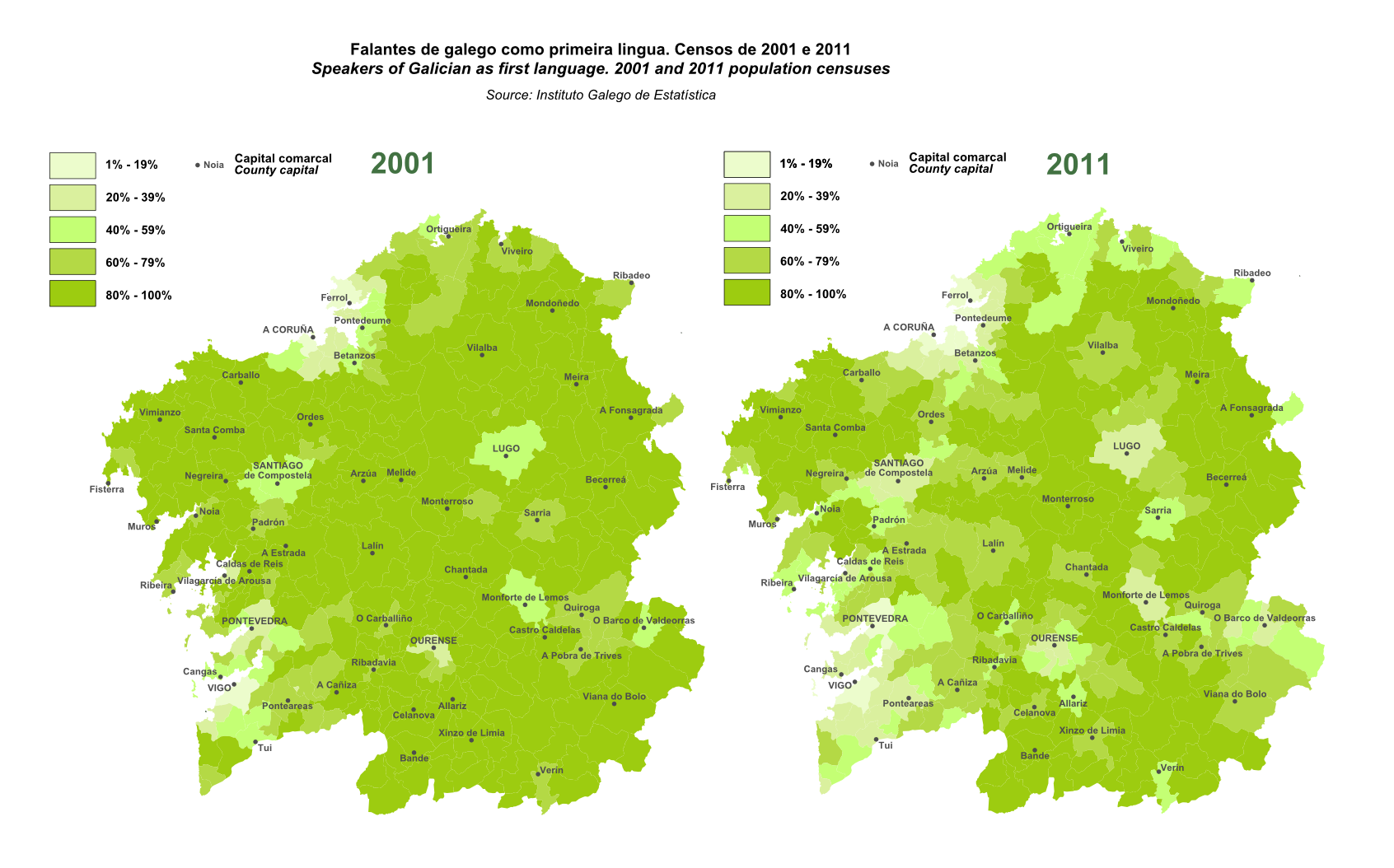
Speakers of Galician as a first language in 2001 and 2011, according to the Galician Institute of Statistics

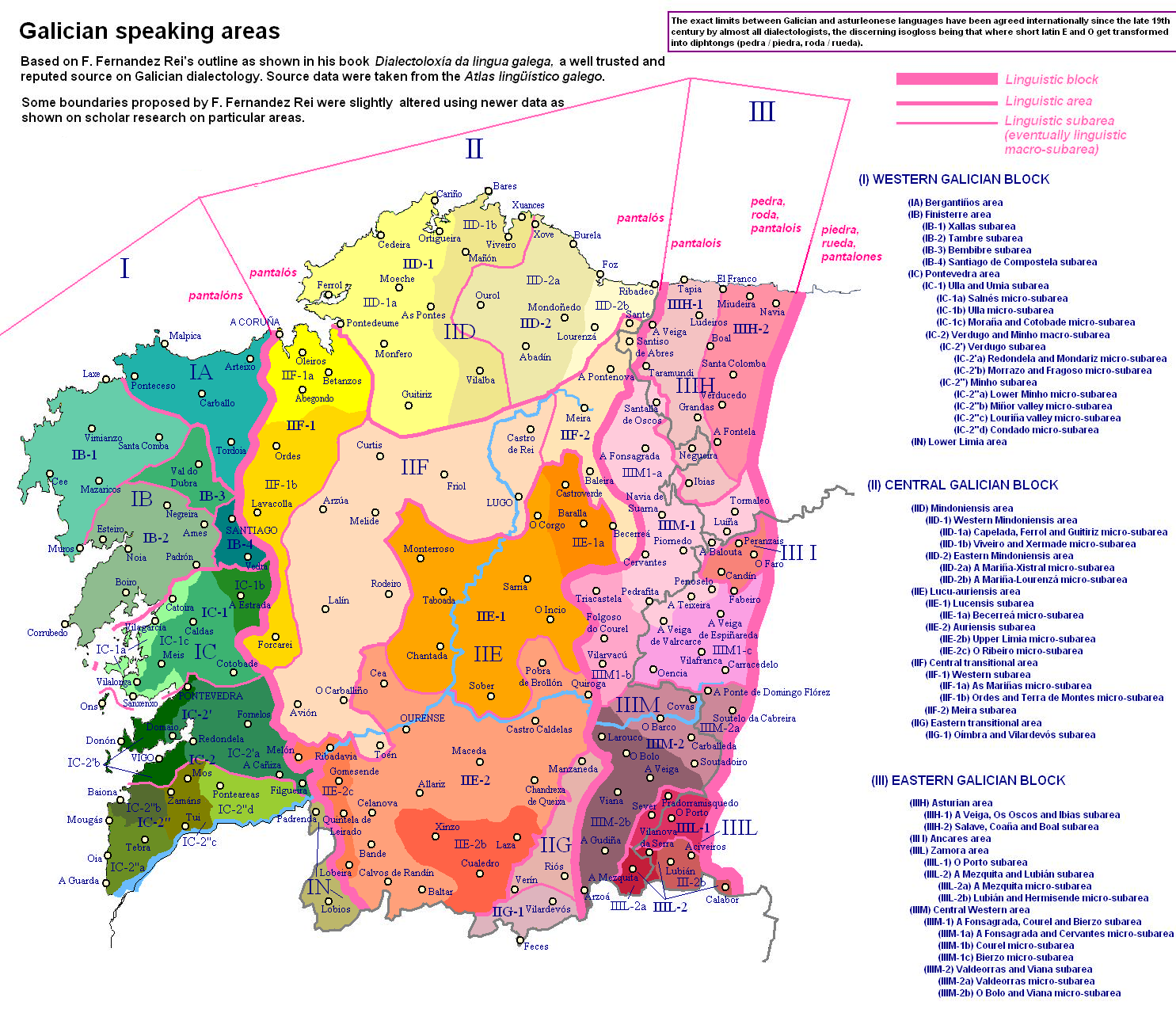
Galician linguistic areas

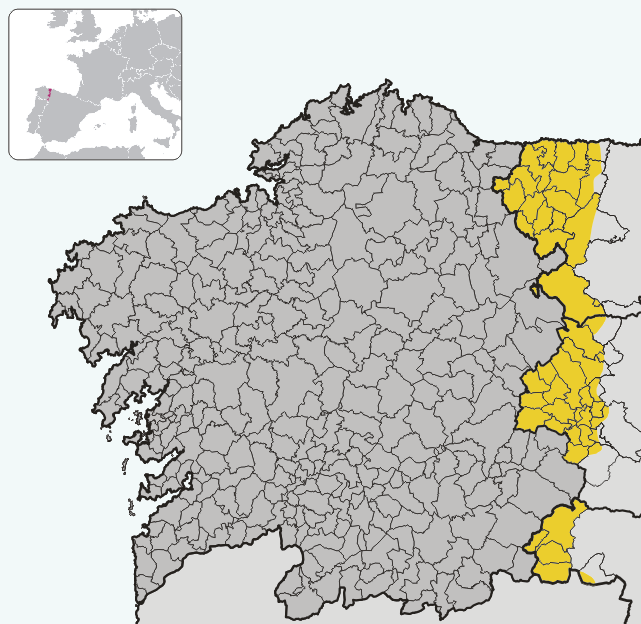
Galician-speaking areas outside Galicia (yellow)

With the advent of democracy, Galician has been brought into the country's institutions, and it is now co-official with Spanish in Galicia. Galician is taught in schools, and there is a public Galician-language television channel, Televisión de Galicia.

Today, the most common language for everyday use in the largest cities of Galicia is Spanish rather than Galician, as a result of this long process of language shift. However, Galician is still the main language in rural areas.

The Royal Galician Academy and other Galician institutions celebrate each 17 May as Galician Literature Day (Día das Letras Galegas), dedicated each year to a deceased Galician-language writer chosen by the academy.

=== Use of the Galician language ===
Use of Galician splits by age, with over half of those over 45 indicating that Galician is their primary language, with lower numbers for the younger population. Those under 45 were more likely than those over 45 to answer that they never use Galician.

Use of Galician and Spanish in Galicia (2003–2018)
	2003		2008		2013		2018
Always speaks in Galician	42.9%	1,112,670	29.9%	779,297	30.8%	789,157	30.3%	778,670
Speaks more often in Galician than Spanish	18.2%	471,781	26.4%	687,618	20.0%	513,325	21.6%	553,338
Speaks more often in Spanish than Galician	18.7%	484,881	22.5%	583,880	22.0%	563,135	23.1%	593,997
Always speaks in Spanish	19.6%	506,322	20.0%	521,606	25.9%	664,052	24.2%	621,474
Other situations	0.5%	13,005	1.1%	28,622	1.2%	29,536	0.8%	19,866

Use of Galician also varies greatly depending on the regions and municipalities of Galicia. While in two areas of the Province of A Coruña (Costa da Morte and the Southeast) more than 90% of the population always or mostly speaks in Galician, only the 15.2% of the population does the same in the city of Vigo.

Region	Comarcas included	Galician speakers (percentage) (Note: % of the population who always or mostly speaks in Galician. This percentage excludes those who mainly speak in Spanish but also use Galician.)	Spanish speakers (percentage) (Note: % of the population who always or mostly speaks in Spanish. This percentage excludes those who mainly speak in Galician but also use Spanish.)	Galician speakers (number) (Note: Number of people who always or mostly speaks in Galician. This percentage excludes those who mainly speak in Spanish but also use Galician.)	Spanish speakers (number) (Note: Number of people that always or mostly speaks in Spanish. This percentage excludes those who mainly speak in Galician but also use Spanish.)
A Barbanza-Noia	A Barbanza and Noia	88.85	11.15	82,434	10,344
A Coruña	A Coruña and Betanzos	33.55	66.45	137,812	272,922
A Mariña	A Mariña Oriental, A Mariña Central and A Mariña Occidental	75.85	24.15	50,420	16,053
Caldas-O Salnés	Caldas and O Salnés	63.40	36.60	86,575	49,980
Central Lugo	Terra Chá, Lugo, A Ulloa and Meira	65.04	34.96	105,423	56,676
Central Ourense	Valdeorras, Allariz-Maceda, Terra de Caldelas and Terra de Trives	69.45	30.55	30,152	13,265
Costa da Morte	Bergantiños, Terra de Soneira, Fisterra, Muros and O Xallas	92.43	7.57	117,630	9,627
Eastern Lugo	Os Ancares, A Fonsagrada and Sarria	88.50	11.50	32,025	4,160
Ferrol-Eume-Ortegal	Ferrolterra, O Eume and Ortegal	33.75	66.25	60,202	118,162
Northeast Pontevedra	O Deza and Tabeirós-Terra de Montes	81.85	18.15	50,720	11,249
O Carballiño-O Ribeiro	Carballiño and O Ribeiro	76.42	23.58	30,586	9,436
O Morrazo	O Morrazo	40.56	59.44	31,554	46,233
Ourense	Ourense	39.85	60.15	52,632	79,450
Pontevedra	Pontevedra	38.82	61.18	45,865	72,292
Santiago	Santiago de Compostela, A Barcala and O Sar	55.39	44.61	102,260	82,374
Southeast A Coruña	Arzúa, Terra de Melide and Ordes	93.14	6.86	59,415	4,375
Southern Lugo	Terra de Lemos, Quiroga and Chantada	67.19	32.81	31,065	15,172
Southern Ourense	A Baixa Limia, A Limia, Verín and Viana	88.00	12.00	64,878	8,850
Southern Pontevedra	O Baixo Miño, O Condado and A Paradanta	58.56	41.44	60,392	42,737
Vigo	Vigo	25.50	74.50	99,968	292,115

City	Always speaks Galician	More Galician than Spanish	More Spanish than Galician	Always speaks Spanish
A Coruña	5.34	14.64	31.40	48.62
Ferrol	6.71	10.98	29.59	52.72
Lugo	21.34	23.36	28.88	26.41
Ourense	10.71	22.80	38.85	27.65
Pontevedra	8.38	14.62	35.94	41.06
Santiago de Compostela	20.58	23.31	33.46	22.65
Vigo	3.85	11.36	39,49	45.31

== Dialects ==
Some authors are of the opinion that Galician possesses no real dialects. Despite this, Galician local varieties are collected in three main dialectal blocks, each block comprising a series of areas, being local linguistic varieties that are all mutually intelligible. Some of the main features which distinguish the three blocks are:

- The resolution of medieval nasalised vowels and hiatus: these sometimes turned into diphthongs in the east, while in the center and west the vowels in the hiatus were sometimes assimilated. Later, in the eastern—except Ancarese Galician—and central blocks, the nasal trait was lost, while in the west the nasal trait usually developed into an implosive nasal consonant /ŋ/. In general, these led to important dialectal variability in the inflection in genre and number of words ended in a nasal consonant. So, from medieval irmão 'brother', ladrões 'robbers', irmãas 'sisters' developed eastern Galician irmao, ladrois, irmás; central Galician irmao, ladrós, irmás; western Galician irmán, ladróns, irmáns.

An exception to this rule is constituted by the hiatus in which the first vowel was a nasalised i or u. In those cases, a nasal, palatal /ɲ/ or velar /ŋ/ was usually inserted: ũa 'a / one (fem.)' > unha (Portuguese uma), -ina > -ĩa > -iña (Portuguese -inha). Nevertheless, in Ancarese and Asturian Galician, this process did not take place: A-G vecía, Ancarese vecĩa vs. standard veciña '(female) neighbor' (Port. vizinha), A-G úa, Ancarese ũa vs. standard unha (Port. uma).

- The resolution of hiatus formed by oral vowels had similar developments, most notably those derived from the loss of /l/, which again had important consequences for the declension of words ending in /l/. So, Medieval Galician animaes 'animals' (sing. animal); central and western Galician animás; eastern Galician animais; Asturian Galician animales (/l/ is preserved).
- In the west, /ɡ/ is rendered as a fricative [x ~ ħ ~ h] (gheada), except after a nasal, where it can become a stop [k].
- Stressed vowel metaphony is most notable in the west and center, while in the east it is unknown. It is triggered by a final /o/, which tends to close open-mid vowels, or by a final /a/ which tends to open close-mid ones.
- There are three main sibilant systems, all derived from the medieval Galician one, which was richer and more complex:
  - The common one, extended in the eastern and center regions, presents an opposition /ʃ/ – /s/ – /θ/. In the westernmost parts of this area the opposition of /s/ and /θ/ is lost in postnuclear position, in the coda, both being produced /s/.
  - In the coastal western areas the opposition is /ʃ/ – /s/, /s/ being produced in some regions as a laminal or in some others as an apical. Sometimes this system is even further reduced to just a single /s/. On the other hand, in some areas final /s/ is produced as /ʃ/, as in plenty of Portuguese dialects.
  - In the Limia Baixa region an old six sibilant system is still preserved, with voiced/voiceless opposition: /ʃ/ – /ʒ/; /s̺/ – /z̺/ (apical) and /s̻/ – /z̻/ (laminal).

Each dialectal area is then further defined by these and other more restricted traits or isoglosses:

- Eastern Galician: Asturian area (Eonavian), Ancares area, Zamora area and Central-Eastern area.
- Central Galician: Mindoniense area, Lucu-auriense area, Central Transitional area, and Eastern Transitional area.
- Western Galician: Bergantiños area, Fisterra area, Pontevedra area and Lower Limia area.

Standard Galician is usually based on Central Galician characteristics, but it also incorporates western and eastern traits and features.

=== Examples ===
Galician^{a}			Medieval Galician (13th–15th c.)	Portuguese	Spanish	Latin	English
Western	Central	Eastern	Medieval Galician (13th–15th c.)	Portuguese	Spanish	Latin	English
**cans** [ˈkaŋs]	cas [ˈkas]	cais [ˈkajs]	cães/cããs	cães	perros/canes	canes	dogs
**ladróns** [laˈðɾoŋs]	ladrós [laˈðɾɔs]	ladrois [laˈðɾojs]	ladrões	ladrões	ladrones	latrones	thieves
**irmán** [iɾˈmaŋ]	irmao [iɾˈmaʊ]		irmão	irmão	hermano	germanus	brother
**luz** [ˈlus]		**luz** [ˈluθ]	luz	luz	luz	lux, gen. lūcis	light
**cinco** [ˈsiŋkʊ]	**cinco** [ˈθiŋkʊ]		cinco	cinco	cinco	quinque	five
**ollo** [ˈoɟʊ]			ollo	olho	ojo	oculus	eye
**hora** [ˈɔɾɐ]^{b}	**hora** [ˈɔɾa]/[ˈoɾɐ]	**hora** [ˈoɾɐ]	hora	hora	hora	hora	hour
cantaste(s)^{c}	**cantaches**	cantaste/cantache	cantaste	cantaste	cantaste	cantavisti	you sang
animás		**animais**	animaes	animais	animales	animalia	animals

Bold type indicate official standard spelling. On the phonemic representation.
Metaphony produced by final /a/ and by final /o/ (usually produced [ʊ]). All the diverse productions are considered admissible. In the east there is little to no metaphony.
Different evolution of the group /ste/ led to different desinences for the past tense formation along Galician geography.

== Grammar ==
Galician allows pronominal clitics to be attached to indicative and subjunctive forms, as does Portuguese, unlike modern Spanish. After many centuries of close contact between the two languages, Galician has also adopted many loan words from Spanish, and some calques of Spanish syntax.

Galician usually makes the difference according to gender and categorises words as masculine "o rapaz" (the young man) or feminine "a rapaza" (the young woman). This difference is present in the articles "o / a / os / as" (the), nouns "o can / a cadela" (the dog / the (female) dog), pronouns "el / ela", (he / she) and adjectives "bonitiño / bonitiña" (pretty, beautiful). There is also a neuter set of demonstrative pronouns "isto, iso, aquilo" (this / that). The most typical ending for masculine words is -o, whereas the most typical ending for feminine is -a "o prato / a tixola" (the plate / the frying pan). The difference in the grammatical gender of a word may correspond to a real gender difference in the physical world "xuicioso / xuiciosa" (sensible); the former adjective will qualify a male, and the latter, a female. However, there is no particular reason for objects to be ascribed to a particular grammatical gender or another, it has to do with the gender having been ascribed by tradition and the use of speakers as in the following examples: "o xis / o samba / a mesa / a caricatura" (chalk / the samba / the table / the caricature).

Galician expresses the difference in number with a form for the singular and another for the plural. The most typical suffix to express a plural number is "s", "cantiga / cantigas".

There are two different ways of addressing people: one is the most usual informal pronoun "ti" for the second person singular and "vos" for the second person plural. There are formal ways of directly addressing people: "vostede" for the singular and "vostedes" for the plural.

The last review of the official grammar has established that, if there is no risk of confusion, the exclamation and question marks will appear only at the end of the sentence, thus deprecating the general use of Spanish-like inverted question and exclamation marks.

The verb is inflected. There are regular and irregular verbs in the language. All verbs will appear listed by means of their infinitive form in dictionaries, and there are three typical endings for verbs "-ar / -er / -ir".

== Orthography ==
The current official Galician orthography is guided by the "Normas ortográficas e morfolóxicas do Idioma Galego" (NOMIGa), first introduced in 1982, by the Royal Galician Academy (RAG), based on a report by the Instituto da Lingua Galega (ILG). In July 2003, the Royal Galician Academy modified the language normative to admit and promote some archaic Galician-Portuguese forms conserved in modern Portuguese, merging the NOMIG and the main proposals of the moderate sectors of reintegrationism; the resulting orthography is used by the vast majority of media, cultural production and virtually all official matters including education.

The Galician Language Association (AGAL) maintains a separate orthography known as International Galician or Reintegrationist, which was first published in 1983 and converges with modern Portuguese orthography. It does not have official status in Galicia but is accepted as a form of Portuguese in international institutions such as the Community of Portuguese Language Countries or the European Parliament. In recent years, there has been greater social support for binormativism, the legal recognition of both norms, as in the case of the Norwegian language.

Phoneme-to-grapheme correspondence
Phoneme (IPA)	Main allophones	Graphemes	Example (when two spelling variants are shown, the former follows the AGAL orthography and the latter follows the RAG orthography)
/b/	[b], [β̞]	b, v	bebo [ˈbeβ̞ʊ] '(I) drink', alva or alba [ˈalβ̞ɐ] 'sunrise', vaca [ˈbakɐ] 'cow', cova [ˈkɔβ̞ɐ] 'cave'
/θ/	[θ] (dialectal [s])	c, ç, z or c, z	macio [ˈmaθjʊ] 'soft', caçar or cazar [kɑˈθaɾ] 'to hunt', cruz [ˈkɾuθ] 'cross'
/tʃ/	[tʃ]	ch	chamar [tʃaˈmaɾ] 'to call', achar [aˈtʃaɾ] 'to find'
/d/	[d], [ð̞]	d	vida [ˈbið̞ɐ] 'life', quadro or cadro [ˈkað̞ɾʊ] 'frame'
/f/	[f]	f	feltro [ˈfɛltɾʊ] 'felt', freixo [ˈfɾejʃʊ] 'ash-tree'
/ɡ/	[ɡ], [ɣ] (dialectal [ħ])	g, gu	fungo [ˈfuŋɡʊ] 'fungus', guerra [ˈɡɛrɐ] 'war', o gato [ʊ ˈɣatʊ] 'the cat'
/ɟ/	[ɟ]	lh or ll	molhado or mollado [moˈɟað̞ʊ] 'wet'
/k/	[k]	c, qu	casa [ˈkasɐ] 'house', querer [keˈɾeɾ] 'to want'
/l/	[l]	l	lua or lúa [ˈluɐ] 'moon', algo [ˈalɣʊ] 'something', mel [ˈmɛl] 'honey'
/m/	[m], [ŋ] (Note: The phonemes /m/, /n/, /ɲ/ and /ŋ/ coalesce in implosive position as the archiphoneme /N/, which, phonetically, is usually [ŋ].)	m	memória or memoria [meˈmɔɾjɐ] 'memory', campo [ˈkampʊ] 'field', álbum [ˈalβuŋ]
/n/	[n], [m], [ŋ]	n	ninho or niño [ˈniɲʊ] 'nest', onte [ˈɔntɪ] 'yesterday', conversar [kombeɾˈsaɾ] 'to talk', irmão or irmán [iɾˈmaŋ] 'brother'
/ɲ/	[ɲ]	nh or ñ	manhã or mañá [maˈɲa] 'morning'
/ŋ/	[ŋ]	mh or nh	algumha or algunha [alˈɣuŋɐ] 'some'
/p/	[p]	p	carpa [ˈkaɾpɐ] 'carp'
/ɾ/	[ɾ]	r	hora [ˈɔɾɐ] 'hour', colher or coller [koˈɟeɾ] 'to grab'
/r/	[r]	r, rr	rato [ˈratʊ] 'mouse', carro [ˈkarʊ] 'cart'
/s/	[s̺] (dialectal [s̻]), [z̺]	s, ss or s	selo [ˈs̺elʊ] 'seal, stamp', cousa [ˈkows̺ɐ] 'thing', mesmo [ˈmɛz̺mʊ] 'same', isso or iso [ˈisʊ] "that"
/t/	[t]	t	trato [ˈtɾatʊ] 'deal'
/ʃ/	[ʃ]	g, j or x	gente or xente [ˈʃentɪ] 'people', janela or xanela [ʃa.ˈnɛ.la] 'window', muxica [muˈʃikɐ] 'ash-fly'
/i/	[i]	i	
/e/, /ɛ/	[e], [ɛ], [i]	e	
/a/	[a], [ɐ]	a	
/o/, /ɔ/	[o], [ɔ], [u]	o	
/u/	[u]	u	

=== Acute accent ===
Syllabic stress is significant in Galician. One syllable in each word receives primary stress. The syllable receiving the primary stress can generally be identified by the spelling of the word according to the language's rules of orthography. In cases where the stress is not at the default location indicated by the spelling, an acute accent (´) is placed over the main vowel of the stressed syllable, as in paspalhás or paspallás ('quail'), móbil ('mobile'), and cárcere ('jail', 'gaol').

The acute accent has some other functions. Sometimes it shows that adjacent vowels represent separate syllables rather than a diphthong. Acute accents are written on top of upper- as well as lower-case letters: Óscar. An acute accent may also be used to distinguish between two words that are otherwise homonyms.

=== Examples ===
English	Galician (RAG)	Galician (AGAL)	Portuguese	Spanish
good morning	bo día / bos días	bom dia		buenos días
What is your name?	Como te chamas?			¿Cómo te llamas?
I love you	quérote / ámote	amo-te		te quiero / te amo
excuse me	desculpe			perdón / disculpe
thanks / thank you	grazas	graças / obrigado	obrigado	gracias
welcome	benvido	bem-vido / bem-vindo	bem-vindo	bienvenido
goodbye	adeus			adiós
yes	si	si / sim		sí
no	non	nom	não	no
dog	can	cam	cão	perro (rarely, can)
grandfather	avó	avô		abuelo
grandmother	avoa	avoa / avó	avó	abuela
newspaper	periódico / xornal	jornal		periódico
mirror	espello	espelho		espejo
nation	nación	naçom	nação	nación
sulfur	xofre	enxofre		azufre
desire	desexo	desejo		deseo
foreign	estranxeiro	estrangeiro		extranjero
yesterday	onte	ontem		ayer
game / match	xogo	jogo		juego
law / right	dereito	direito		derecho
judge	xuíz / xuíza	juíz / juíza		juez / jueza
chess	xadrez			ajedrez
faculty	facultade	faculdade		facultad
difficulty	dificultade	dificuldade		dificultad
syrup	xarope			jarabe
opportunity	oportunidade			oportunidad
probability	probabilidade			probabilidad

English	Galician (RAG)	Galician (AGAL)	Portuguese	Spanish	Latin
Our Father who art in heaven,	Noso Pai que estás no ceo:	Nosso Pai que estás no Céu:	Pai Nosso que estais no Céu:	Padre nuestro que estás en los cielos:	Pater noster qui es in caelis:
hallowed be thy name. Thy kingdom come. Thy will be done on earth as it is in heaven.	santificado sexa o teu nome, veña a nós o teu reino e fágase a túa vontade aquí na terra coma no ceo.	santificado seja o Teu nome, venha a nós o Teu reino e seja feita a Tua vontade aqui na terra como no céu.	santificado seja o Vosso nome, venha a nós o Vosso reino, seja feita a Vossa vontade assim na Terra como no Céu.	santificado sea tu Nombre, venga a nosotros tu reino y hágase tu voluntad en la tierra como en el cielo.	sanctificetur nomen tuum, adveniat regnum tuum, fiat voluntas tua sicut in caelo et in terra.
Give us this day our daily bread,	O noso pan de cada día dánolo hoxe;	O nosso pam de cada dia dá-no-lo hoje;	O pão nosso de cada dia nos dai hoje;	Danos hoy nuestro pan de cada día;	panem nostrum quotidianum da nobis hodie;
and forgive us our trespasses, as we forgive those who trespass against us,	e perdóanos as nosas ofensas como tamén perdoamos nós a quen nos ten ofendido;	e perdoa-nos as nossas ofensas como tamém perdoamos nós a quem nos tem ofendido;	Perdoai-nos as nossas ofensas assim como nós perdoamos a quem nos tem ofendido;	y perdónanos nuestras ofensas como también nosotros perdonamos a los que nos ofenden;	et dimitte nobis debita nostra sicut et nos dimittimus debitoribus nostris;
and let us not fall into temptation, but liberate us from evil.	e non nos deixes caer na tentación, mais líbranos do mal.	e nom nos deixes cair na tentaçom, mais livra-nos do mal.	e não nos deixeis cair em tentação, mas livrai-nos do mal.	y no nos dejes caer en tentación, sino líbranos del mal.	et ne nos inducas in tentationem; sed libera nos a malo.
Amen.	Amén.	Amém.		Amén.	Amen.

==== Days of the week ====
English	Galician (RAG)		Galician (AGAL)	Portuguese	Spanish
Monday	Luns	Segunda feira	Segunda-feira		Lunes
Tuesday	Martes	Terza feira	Terça-feira		Martes
Wednesday	Mércores	Cuarta/corta feira	Quarta-feira		Miércoles
Thursday	Xoves	Quinta feira	Quinta-feira		Jueves
Friday	Venres	Sexta feira	Sexta-feira		Viernes
Saturday	Sábado				
Sunday	Domingo				

==== Months of the year ====
English	Galician (RAG)	Galician (AGAL)	Portuguese	Spanish
January	Xaneiro	Janeiro		Enero
February	Febreiro	Fevereiro		Febrero
March	Marzo	Março		Marzo
April	Abril			
May	Maio			Mayo
June	Xuño	Junho		Junio
July	Xullo	Julho		Julio
August	Agosto			
September	Setembro			Septiembre
October	Outubro			Octubre
November	Novembro			Noviembre
December	Decembro	Dezembro		Diciembre

== See also ==
- Barallete
- Castrapo
- Fala dos arxiñas, a jargon of Galician masons
- Galician-language literature
- Galicia irredenta
- Languages of Spain
- Leonese language
- List of Galician words of Celtic origin
