= List of Galician words of Celtic origin =

This is a list of Galician words of Celtic origin, many of them being shared with Portuguese (sometimes with minor differences) since both languages are from medieval Galician-Portuguese. A few of these words existed in Latin as loanwords from a Celtic source, usually Gaulish, while others have been later received from other languages, mainly French, Occitan, and in some cases Spanish. Finally, some were directly acquired from Gallaecian, the local pre-Latin Celtic language. Any form with an asterisk (*) is unattested and therefore hypothetical.

A systematic investigation of the Celtic words in Galician-Portuguese is still lacking.

== A – C ==
- abanqueiro [m] 'waterfall' < *'(beaver) dam', formally a derivative in -arium of *abanco, from Proto-Celtic: *abankos 'beaver, water demon' cognate of Old Irish: abacc 'dwarf', Welsh: afanc 'beaver, dwarf', Breton: avank 'dwarf, sea monster'. Akin also to Arpitan: avans 'wicker'.
- abeneiro [m] 'common alder', a derivative in -arium of *abona 'river', related to Breton: aven, Welsh: afon, Irish: abha/abhainn 'river'.
- abrancar 'to embrace', from Latin: branca 'paw', of probable Celtic origin.
- abrollar 'to sprout', from Proto-Celtic: *brogilos 'copse'.
- álamo [m] 'poplar tree', German: elmaz 'elm' (< *h_{1}elHm-o), Latin: ulmus 'elm' (< *h_{1}elHm-o), Proto-Celtic: *alamo (by Joseph's rule < *elamo < *h_{1}elHm-o)., but Transalpine Gaulish: lemo- / limo- 'elm', Old Irish: lem 'elm' (< *limos)
- Old Galician ambas [f p] 'waters, river', ambas mestas [f] 'confluence', from Celtic ambe 'water, river', akin to Gaulish ambe 'river', Old Irish abu.
- androlla 'pig's large intestine', from *anterolia 'entrails' < *h_{1}ṇter-o 'that is between, internal', Asturian androya, Sanskrit antrá 'entrails, guts', Armenian ənderk, Hittite andurza 'insides', Greek éntera, Celtic enātro
- angazo 'rake', from *ankatio 'hook' < *h_{2}ṇk-ā-tyo, Asturian angazu and angüezu, old Irish écath ‘fish hook’, middle Welsh anghad < *h_{2}ṇk-o-to (EDPC: 37).
- banzo [m] (alternative spelling banço) 'crossbar, beam', from *wṇk-yo, cognate of Spanish banzo; akin to Irish féice < *wenk-yo, 'ridgepole'.

Derivatives: banza 'backrest', banzado, banzao 'palisade, dam'.

- barga [f] 'hut; wall made of hurdles; hurdle, fence', from Celtic *wraga, cognate of Spanish varga 'hut', French barge, akin to Old Irish fraig, Irish fraigh 'braided wall, roof, pen', Br gwrac'hell 'haybale, rick of hay'.

Derivatives: bargo 'stake or flagstone used for making fences or walls'; barganzo, bargado 'hurdle, fence'.

- barra [f] 'garret, loft, upper platform', from proto-Celtic *barro-, cognate of Irish, Breton barr 'summit, peak, top', Welsh bar
- bascullo [m] 'bundle of straw; broom', from proto-Celtic *baski- 'bundle', cognate of Gascon bascojo 'basket', Asturian bascayu 'broom', Breton bec'h 'bundle, load'.

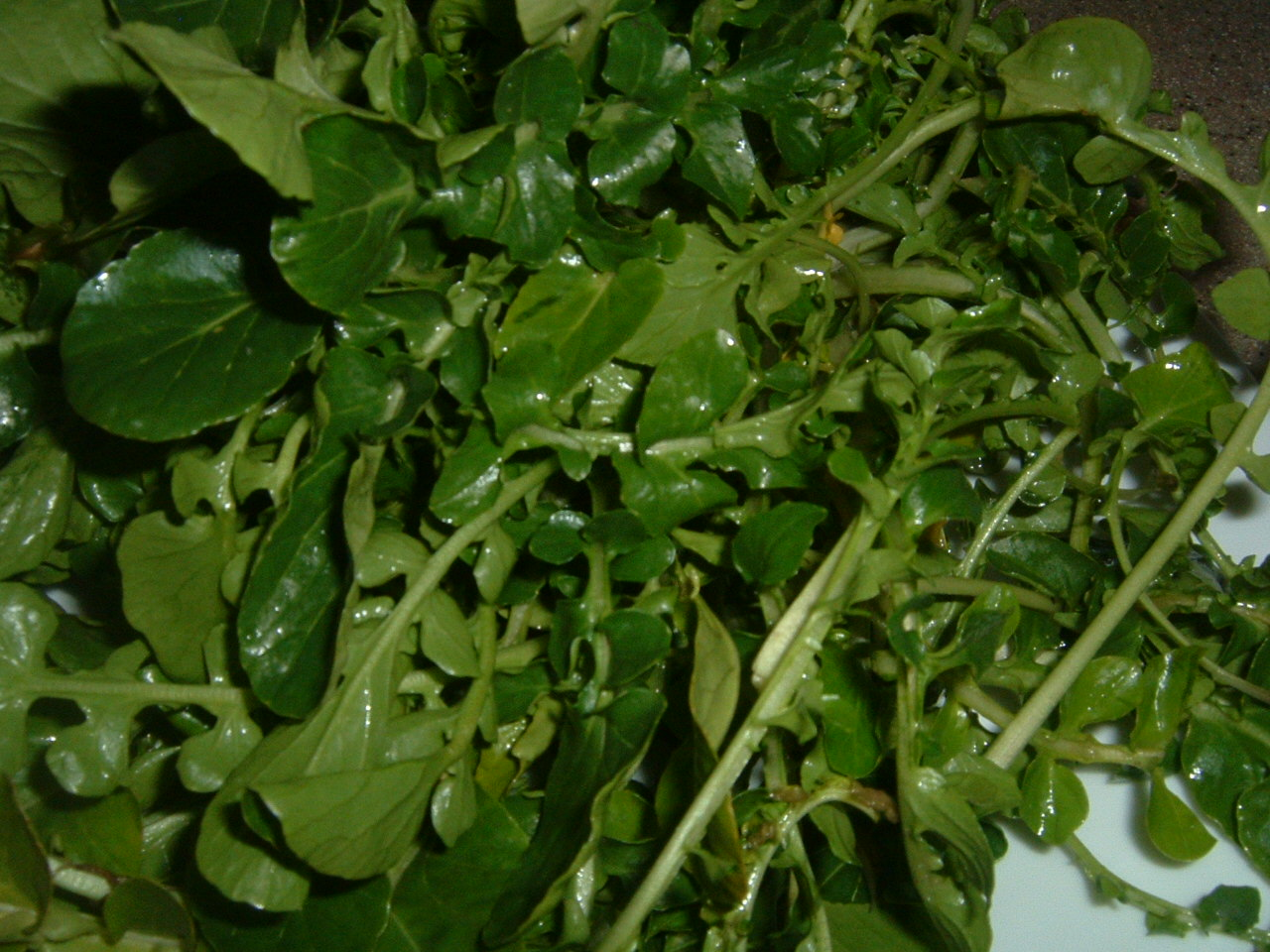
Berros.

- berro [m] 'watercress', from proto-Celtic *beru-ro-, cognate of Spanish berro; akin to Old Irish biror, Welsh berwr, Old Breton beror; similarly French berle 'water parsnip' (< berula ; Ir biolar, Breton beler).
- bico [m] 'beak, kiss', from proto-Celtic *bekko-, cognate of Italian becco, French bec.

Derivatives: bicar 'to kiss', bicaño 'hill', bicallo (a fish, Gadus luscus).

- bidueiro [m] < *betūlariu, biduo [m] < *betūlu, bidulo [m] < *betūllu 'birch', from Celtic *betu- or *betū-, cognate of Spanish biezo, Catalan beç, Occitan bèç (< bettiu); Spanish abedul, French bouleau, Italian betulla (< betula); akin to Irish beith, Welsh bedw, Breton bezv.

Derivatives: Bidueiral, Bidual 'place with birch-trees'.

- billa, alternative spelling bilha, [f] 'spigot; stick' to Proto-Celtic *beljo- 'tree, trunk', akin to Old Irish bille 'large tree, tree trunk', Manx billey 'tree', Welsh pill 'stump', Breton pil; cognate of French bille 'log, chunk of wood'.
- borba [f] 'mud, slime, mucus', from proto-Celtic *borwâ-, cognate of French bourbe 'mud'; akin to Irish borb 'mud, slime', bearbh 'boiling', Welsh berw 'boiling', Breton berv 'broth, bubbling'.

Derivatives: borbento 'mucilaginous'.

- borne [m] 'edge', from French borne 'milestone, landmark', from Old French bosne, bodne, from Vulgar Latin *bodĭna / *budĭna 'border tree', from proto-Celtic *botina 'troop'., akin to Old Irish buiden, Welsh byddin 'army' (from *budīnā)
- braga [f] 'trousers', from proto-Celtic *braco-, cognate of Spanish, Occitan braga, French braie, Italian brache.

Derivatives: bragal, bragada 'spawn', bragueiro 'trus'.

- braña [f] (alternative spelling branha) 'meadow, bog, quagmire', from proto-Celtic *bragno-, cognate of Asturian and Cantabrian braña, Catalan braina, akin to Irish brén, Welsh braen, Breton brein 'putrid'; Ir bréanar, W braenar, Br breinar 'fallow field'.

Derivatives: brañal, brañeira, brañento 'idem'.

- breixo [m] 'heather', from *broccius, from Proto-Celtic *vroiki-, akin to Old Irish froich, Welsh grug, gwrug, Cornish grug, Breton brug; cognate of Spanish brezo, Occitan bruga, French bruyère.
- Old Galician bren [m] 'bran', maybe from Provençal brem, from proto-Celtic *brenno-, cognate of French bran, Lombard bren.
- bringa [f]'stalk, rod', from *brīnikā, from Celtic *brīnos 'rod'; akin to Welsh brwyn 'rush', Cornish broenn, Breton broen; cognate of French brin 'blade (of grass), stalk'.
- brío [m] 'might, power', from Italian brio, from Catalan/Old Occitan briu 'wild', from Celtic *brigos, cognate of Occitan briu, Old French brif 'finesse, style'; akin to Old Irish bríg 'power', Welsh bri 'prestige, authority', Breton bri 'respect'.
- Old Galician busto [m] 'cattle farm, dairy', from a Celtic compound *bow-sto- meaning 'cow-place', akin to Celtiberian boustom 'cow shed, byre', Old Irish bua-thech 'cow house/byre'; cognate of Portuguese bostar, Spanish bustar

Derivatives: bustar 'pastures'.

- cai [m] 'quay, jetty', maybe from French (itself from Norman) quai, from proto-Celtic *kag-yo-, akin to Welsh cae, Cornish ke, Breton kae 'hedge'; French chai 'cellar'.
- callao [m] 'boulder; pebble', from Celtic *kalyāwo- 'stone'.
- cambiar 'to change', from Vulgar Latin cambiare, from proto-Celtic *kambo-, cognate of French changer, Occitan/Spanish cambiar, Catalan canviar, Italian cambiare; akin to Breton kemm 'exchange', Old Irish cimb 'ransom'.

Derivatives: cambio 'exchange', cambiador 'exchanger'.

- camba [f] 'wheel rim' from proto-Celtic *kambo-, cognate of Old Irish camm 'crooked, bent, curved'. Cognate of Occitan cambeta 'part of plough', Limousin Occitan chambija (< *cambica) 'part of plough'

Derivatives: cambito, cambada, camballa, cambeira 'coil; crooked log for hanging fish', cambela 'type of plough', cambota 'beam'.

- camiño [m] 'pathway', alternative spelling caminho, from Vulgar Latin *cammīnus, from proto-Celtic *kanxsman-, cognate of Italian cammino, French chemin, Spanish camino, Catalan camí, Occitan camin; akin to Old Irish céimm, Cornish and Breton kamm 'step', Asturian galmu 'step' < *kan-mo.

Derivatives: camiñar 'to walk'.

- camisa [f] 'shirt' from Latin, from Gaulish camisia. cognate of Spanish/Occitan camisa, Italian camicia, French chemise
- cando [m] 'dry stick', from medieval candano, from Celtic *kando- 'bright, white', cognate of Welsh cann 'bright, light'.
- canga' [f] 'collar, yoke', from Celtic *kambika. Akin to Irish 'cuing' yoke.
- canto [m] 'rim, corner', from proto-Celtic *kanto-, akin to Old Irish cét 'round stone pillar, Welsh cant 'tire rim', Breton kant 'disk'; cognate of Old French chant, Occitan cant, Spanish canto.

Derivatives: recanto 'corner', cantón 'edge of a field', acantoar 'to hide, to isolate', cantil 'cliff'

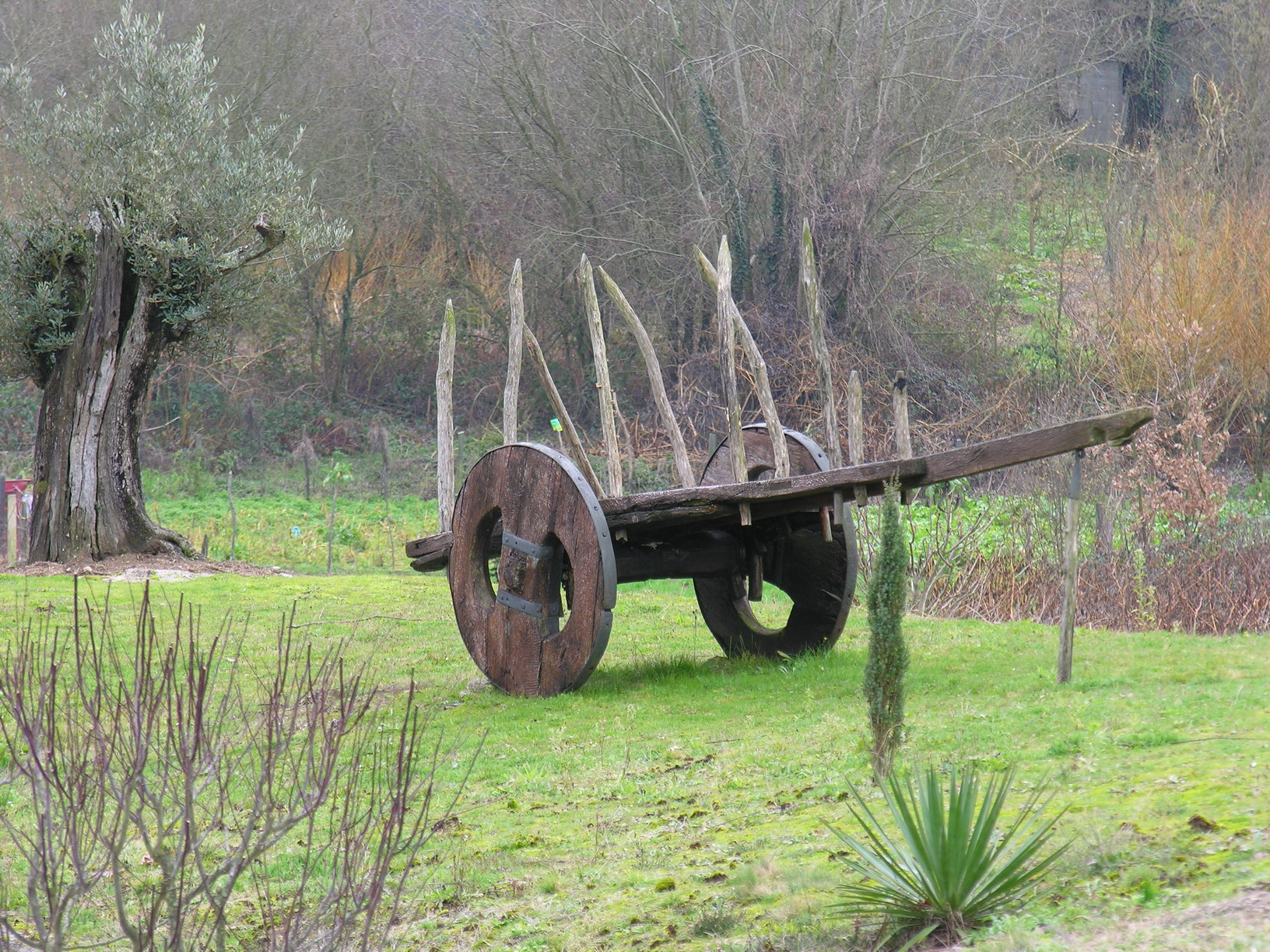
A Galician traditional carro. The wheels are built with cambas or curved pieces; the laterals of the cart are called chedas.

- carozo [m] 'fruit core', asturian caruezu, both from *karosio < *kr_{o}-o-syo, related with Celtic *karīso ‘fruit core’ (< *kr_{o}-ī-so, Welsh ceri, Schrijver 1991, 208) and Latin carīna ‘nut shell’ (< *kr_{o}-is-na, EDL: 93).
- carro [m] 'cart, wagon', from Vulgar Latin carrum, from proto-Celtic *karro-, cognate of Rumanian car, Italian carro, French char, Provençal car, Spanish carro; akin to Irish carr, Welsh car, Breton karr.

Derivatives: carreira 'road', carregar 'to load'.

- caxigo [m] 'oak; Portuguese oak', from *cassīcos, from Celtic *cassos 'curly, twisted', akin to Irish cas 'twist, turn, spin', Old Welsh cascord 'to twist'; cognate of Asturian caxigu, Aragonese caixico, Gascon casse, French chêne 'oak' (< *cassanos).
- centolo [m] 'European spider crab', akin to Gaulish personal name CINTULLOS 'the first one', from PCl *kintu- 'first'.
- cervexa [f] 'beer', alternative spelling cerveja, from Vulgar Latin *cerevisia, from Gaulish Cognates: Old French cervoise, Provençal, Spanish cerveza; akin to Old Irish coirm, Welsh cwrw, Cornish and Breton korev.
- cheda [f] 'lateral external board of a cart, where the crossbars are affixed', from Medieval Latin cleta, from proto-Celtic *klētā, cognate of Irish cloí (cloidhe) 'fence', clíath 'palisade, hurdle', Welsh clwyd 'barrier, wattle, scaffolding, gate', Cornish kloos 'fence', Breton kloued 'barrier, fence'; cognate of French claie 'rack, wattle fencing', Occitan cleda, Catalan cleda 'livestock pen', Basque gereta.
- choco [m] 'cowbell; squid', from proto-Celtic *klokko-, akin to Old Irish clocc, Welsh cloch, Breton kloc'h; cognate of Asturian llueca and llócara 'cowbell', French cloche 'bell', German Glock.

Derivatives: chocar 'to bang, to shock', chocallo 'cowbell'.

- colmea [m] 'beehive', from a Celtic form *kolmēnā 'made of straw' (cf. Spanish colmena 'beehive'), from *kolmos 'straw', which gave Leonese cuelmo; cf. Welsh calaf "reed, stalk", Cornish kala and kalaven "straw", Breton kolo "stalk").
- cómaro, comareiro [m] 'limits of a patch or field, usually left intentionally unploughed', from proto-Celtic *kom-ɸare-(yo)-, cognate of Old Irish comair 'in front of', Welsh cyfair 'direction, place, spot, acre'. Or either to *kom-boros 'brought together'.

Derivatives: acomarar 'to mark out a field (literally to dote with cómaros)'.

- comba [f] 'valley, inflexion', from proto-Celtic *kumbā, cognate of North Italian comba, French combe, Occitan comba; akin to Irish com, Welsh cwm 'hollow (land form)', Cornish komm 'small valley, dingle', Breton komm 'small valley, deep water'.
- combarro [m], combarrizo [m] 'shed, shelter', from proto-Celtic *kom-ber-o- 'bring together'. Cognate of Middle French combres 'palisade in a river, for fishing'.
- combo [m] (adj.) 'curved, bent', from Celtic *kumbo-, cognate of Provençal comb, Spanish combo.

Derivatives: combar 'to bend'.

- comboa [f] 'corral used for capturing fish trapped in low tide', from Old Galician combona, from Celtic *combā 'valley' or *cambos 'bent'.
- croio [m] 'rolling stone', croia [f] 'pip', from old-galician crougia > *cruia 'stone', Proto-Celtic *krowka (EDPC: 226, Oir. crùach 'hill'. W. crug 'cairn, hillock'. Derivatives: croio (adj.) 'ugly, rude'; croído, croieira 'stony place/beach'.
- crouca [f] 'head; withers (ox)', from Celtic croucā, cognate of Provençal crauc 'heap', Occitan cruca 'cape (land form)'; akin to Irish cruach 'pile, haystack', Welsh crug 'hillock, barrow, heap', Cornish and Breton krug 'mound, barrow'.

Derivatives: crocar 'swell, bulge, bruise', croque 'bump'.

- curro [m] 'corral, pen; corner', from Celtic *korro-, akin to Middle Irish cor 'circle, turn', corrán 'sickle', Welsh cor 'enclosure', Cornish kor 'turn, veering'; cognate of Spanish corro, corral.

Derivatives: curruncho, currucho, currullo 'corner, end', currusco 'protruding part (in bread)', curral 'corral, pen'.

== D – Z ==
- dorna [f] 'a type of boat; trough, measurement (volume)', from proto-Celtic *durno- 'fist'., Irish dorn fist, Welsh dwrn, Cornish and Breton dorn 'hand'; Akin to Old French, Occitan dorn, 'a handful'. Nevertheless, the Asturian duerna 'bowl' demand a form **dorno-, and for this reason, perhaps a form *dor-no (made of wood) is more possible.
- embaixada [f] 'embassy', from Provençal ambaissada, from ambaissa 'service, duty', from proto-Celtic *ambactos 'servant', akin to Welsh amaeth 'farm', Cornish ammeth 'farming', Old Breton ambaith, modern Breton amaezh.
- engo, irgo [m] 'danewort', from *édgo, from a Low Latin EDUCUS, from Gaulish odocos, idem. Cognate of Spanish yezgo, Asturian yeldu, Provençal olègue, idem.
- gabela [f] 'handful, faggot', alternative spelling gavela, from proto-Celtic *gabaglā-, cognate of French javelle, Provençal gavela, Spanish gavilla; akin to Old Cornish gavael 'catch, capture', Irish gabháil 'get, take, grab, capture', gabhal 'fork'.
- galbán [m] 'lazy', and galbana [f] 'laziness', akin to Gaulish galba, from proto-Celtic *galbā.
- galga [f] 'plain stone', from *gallikā, to Proto-Celtic *gallos 'stone', akin to Irish gall, French jalet 'stone bullet' galet 'pebble' galette 'plain cake', Spanish galga.

Derivatives: galgar 'carving a stone to make it plain and regular'.

- gorar 'to hatch, to brood (an egg, or a sickness)', from proto-Celtic *gʷhor-, akin to Irish gor 'sit on eggs, brood (eggs)' Welsh/Cornish gori 'to brood, sit (on eggs)', Breton goriñ.

Derivatives: goro 'warmed infertile egg'.

- gubia [f] 'gouge', from Celtic *gulbia, from *gulb- 'beak', cognate of Portuguese goiva, Spanish gubia, French gouge, Italian gubba; akin to Old Irish gulba 'sting', Irish gealbhán 'sparrow', Welsh gylyf 'sickle', gylf 'beak'.
- lándoa [f] 'uncultivated plot', from *landula, Romance derivative of proto-Celtic *landā, cognate of Old Irish lann 'land, plot', Welsh lann 'church-yard', Breton lann 'heath', French lande 'sandy moor, heath', Provençal, Catalan landa.
- laxe [f] 'stone slab', alternative spelling lage, from the medieval form lagena, from proto-Celtic *ɸlāgenā, cognate of Old Irish lágan, láigean, Welsh llain 'broad spearhead, blade'; akin to Irish láighe 'mattock, spade'.
- legua or légua [f] 'league', to Proto-Celtic *leukā, cognate of French lieue, Spanish legua; akin to Old Irish líe (genitive líag) 'stone', Irish lia

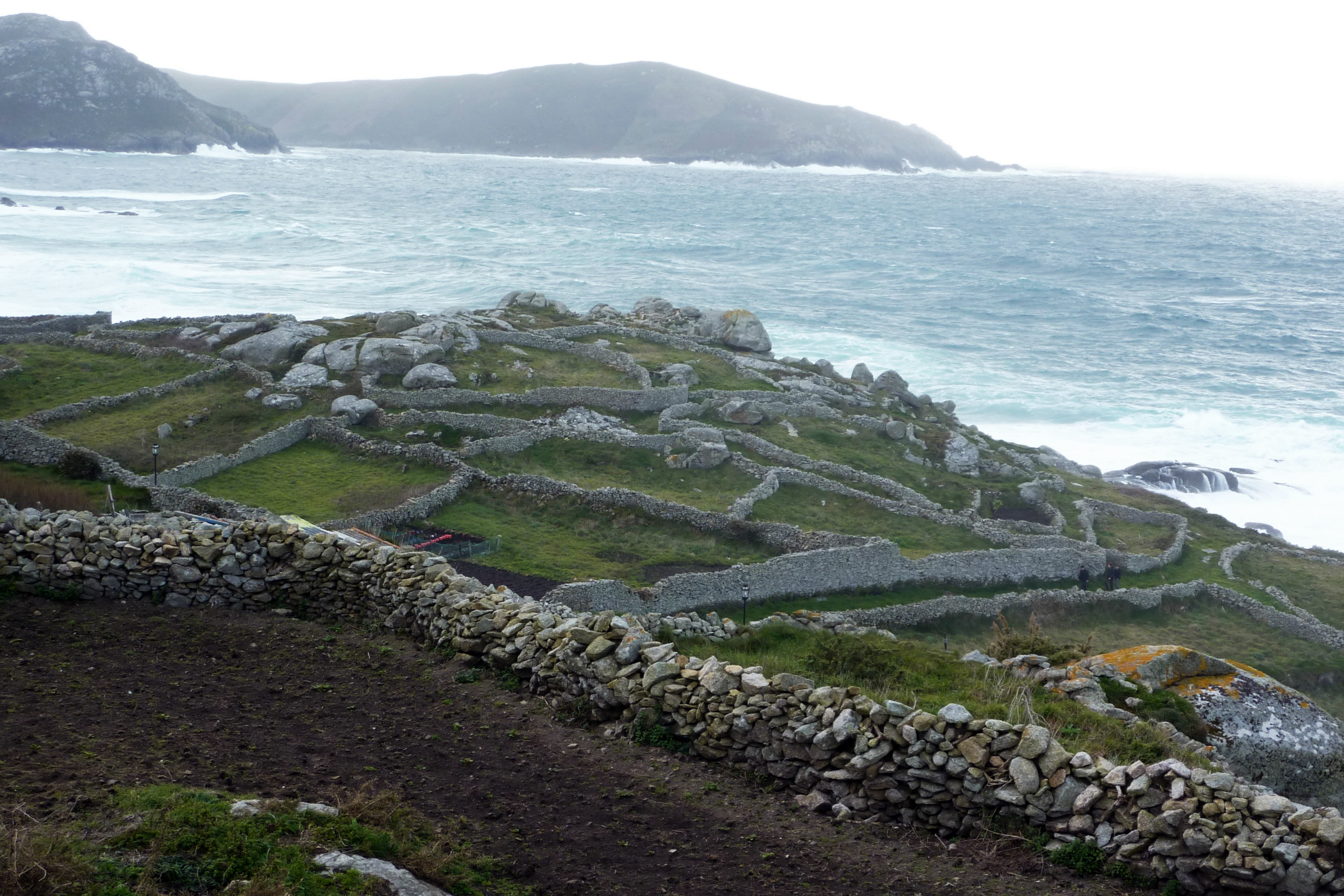
Walled leiras, in Muxía, Galicia.

- leira [f] 'plot, delimited and levelled field', from the medieval form laria, from proto-Celtic *ɸlār-yo-, akin to Old Irish làr 'ground, floor', Cornish and Breton leur 'ground', Welsh llawr 'floor'. However, for the Spanish dialectal lera 'vegetable garden, area of land' (Salamanca) is proposed a Latin origin *illam aream > *l'aream > laira, which don't appears to be appropriate for the Galician forms, already documented as larea and ipsa larea in 870.

Derivatives: leiro 'small, ou unleveled, plot', leirar 'land working', leiroto, leiruca 'small plot'.

- Old Galician ler [m] 'sea, seashore', from proto-Celtic *liros, cognate of Old Irish ler, Irish lear, Welsh llyr 'sea'.
- lercha [f] 'rod, stick (used for hanging fish)', from proto-Celtic *wliskā 'stick', cognate of Old Irish flesc.
- lousa [f] 'flagstone', from Proto-Celtic *laws-, cognate of Provençal lausa, Spanish losa, French losenge 'diamond'.

Derivatives: enlousar 'to cover with flagstones', lousado 'roof'.

- marulo [m] 'big, fat kid', from *mārullu, diminutive of Proto-Celtic *māros 'large, great, big', akin to Irish mór, Welsh mawr, Cornish and Breton meur.
- meniño [m] 'kid, child, baby', alternative spelling meninho, from medieval mennino, from proto-Celtic *menno-, akin to Old Irish menn 'kid (goat)', Irish meannán, Welsh myn, Cornish mynn, Breton menn.

Derivatives: meniñez 'childhood'.

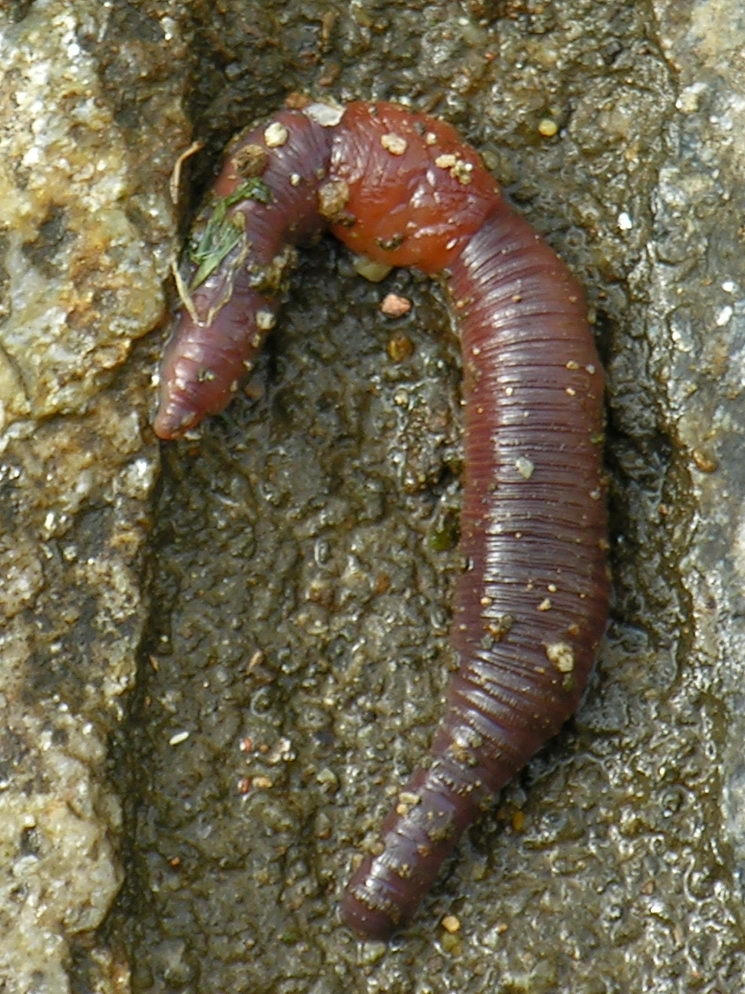
A miñoca.

- miñoca [f] 'earthworm', alternative spelling minhoca, dialectal mioca, miroca, from medieval *milocca, from proto-Celtic *mîlo-, akin to Asturian milu, merucu 'earthworm', Irish míol 'worm, maggot', Welsh, Cornish and Breton mil 'animal'.
- mostea [f] 'bundle of straw', from proto-Celtic *bostā- 'hand, palm, fist'., Irish bos, bas 'palm of hand'.
- olga [f] 'patch, plot', from proto-Celtic *ɸolkā, cognate of French ouche, Provençal olca. Nevertheless, *ɸolkā should become **ouca.
- osca [f] 'notch', from Celtic *oska 'idem', cognate of Asturian güezca, Occitan osca, Old French osche, Modern French ouche, Welsh osg 'idem'.
- peza [f] 'piece', alternative spelling peça, from Vulgar Latin *pettia, from Gaulish petsi, from proto-Celtic *kʷezdi, cognate of Italian pezza, French pièce, Spanish pieza; akin to Old Irish cuit (Irish cuid) 'piece, share, part', Welsh peth 'thing', Breton pezh.

Derivatives: empezar 'to begin'.

- rego [m], rega [f] 'furrow, ditch', from proto-Celtic *ɸrikā, akin to Welsh rhych, Breton reg, Scottish/Irish riach 'trace left from something'; cognate of French raie, Occitan, Catalan rega, Basque erreka, Italian riga 'wrinkle'.

Derivatives: derregar 'to mark out a field', regato 'stream, gully, glen'.

- reo [m] 'Salmo trutta trutta', from a Celtic form rhedo (Ausonius).
- rodaballo [m] 'turbot', alternative spelling rodavalho, from a Celtic composite form *roto-ball-jo-, meaning 'round-extremity', akin to Irish roth 'wheel', Welsh rhod, Breton rod, and Irish ball 'limb, organ'.
- saboga, samborca [f] 'allis shad', akin to Gaulish samauca, idem, from Celtic *samākā 'summery'.
- saio [m] 'coat' and saia [f] 'skirt', from the medieval form sagia, from an ancient Celtic form from which also Latin sagum 'robe'.
- seara, senra [f] 'sown field recently broken up, but which is left fallow', from a medieval form senara, a Celtic compound of *seni- 'apart, separated' (cf. Old Irish sain 'alone', Welsh han 'other') and *aro- 'ploughed field'. (cf. Welsh âr, Irish ár 'ploughed field').
- tasca [f] and tascón [m], 'swingle', related to Galatian taskós 'peg, stake'.
- tol and tola [m / f] 'irrigation channel', to Proto-Celtic *tullo- 'pierced, perforated', akin to Irish toll 'hollow, cave, hole', Welsh twll 'hole', Cornish toll 'hole', Breton toull 'hole'; cognate of Spanish tollo 'hole', Catalan toll 'pool in a river', Old French tolon 'hill, upland'.
- tona [f] 'skin, bark, scum of milk', from proto-Celtic *tondā, cognate of Old Irish tonn, Welsh tonn.

Derivatives: toneira 'pot for obtaining butter from the milk'.

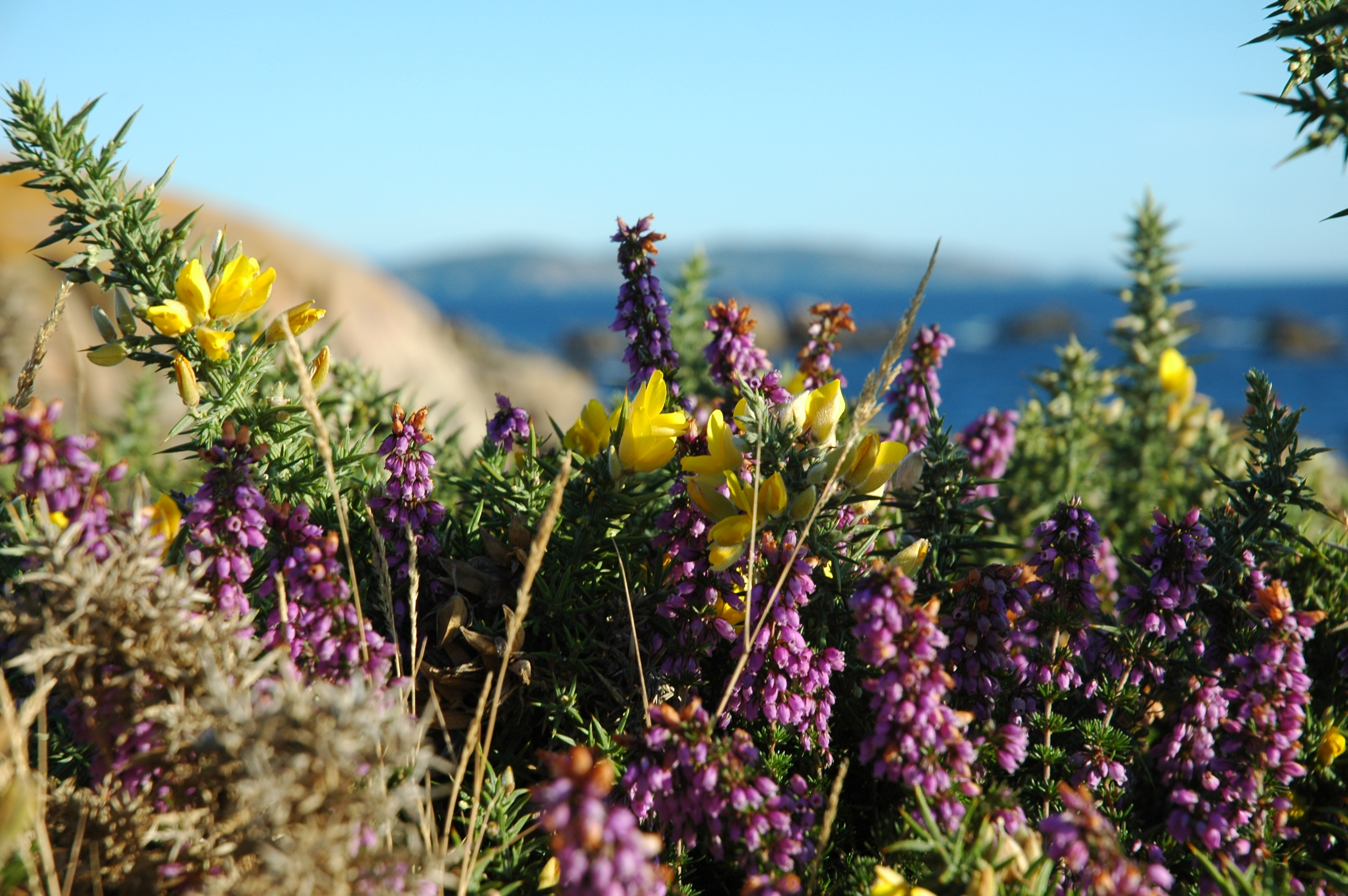
Toxos and breixos, near O Grove

- toxo [m], alternative spelling tojo, 'gorse, furze (Ulex europaeus)', from Celtic *togi-, akin to Spanish/Gascon toja, French dialectal tuie.

Derivatives: fura-toxos 'marten'; toxa 'ulex gallii'; toxedo, toxa, toxeira 'place with toxos'.

- trosma [m] 'awkward, dimwitted', from proto-Celtic *trudsmo- or *truksmo- 'heavy', akin to Old Irish tromm, Welsh trwm.
- trado, trade [m] 'auger', from proto-Celtic *taratro-, cognate of Irish tarathar, Welsh taradr, Breton tarar, Occitan taraire, Catalan taradre, Spanish taladro, French tarière, Romansch tarader.

Derivatives: tradar 'to drill'.
tranca [f], tranco [m] 'beam, pole', from proto-Celtic *tarankā, cognate of Spanish tranca 'club, cudgel', French taranche 'screw bar, ratchet (wine press)', Provençal tarenco; akin to OIr tairinge 'iron nail, tine', Ir tairne 'metal nail, Sc tairnge 'nail'.
Derivatives: taranzón 'pillar inside the potter's oven' < *tarankyon-, tarangallo 'Wood nail, pin', trancar 'to bar a door'.

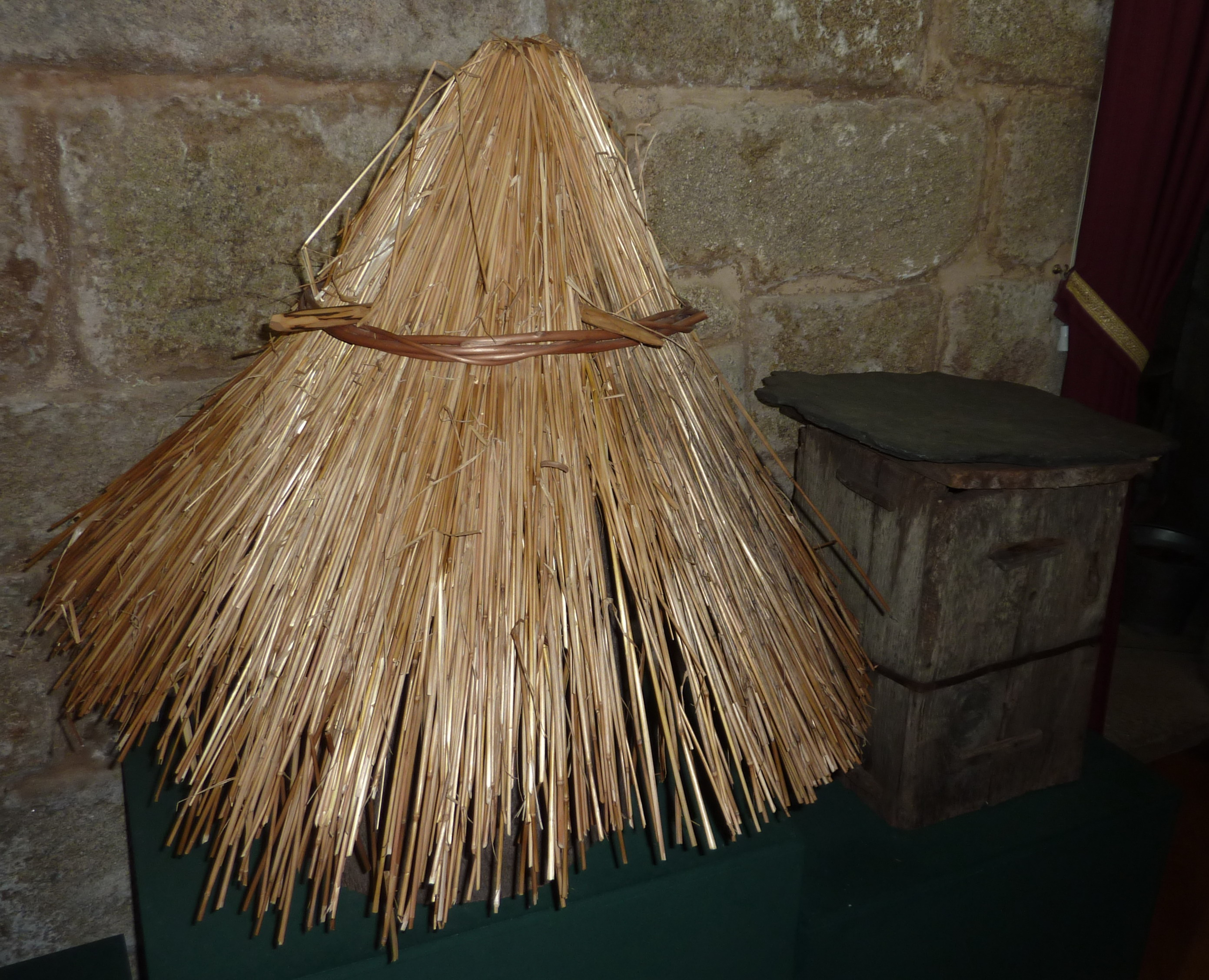
Galician traditional trobos or colmeas (beehives). The closer one is similar to reconstructed Iron Age huts.

- trebo, trobo [m] 'beehive', from the medieval form trebano, proto-Celtic *trebno-, akin to Old Irish treb 'farm', Cornish tre 'home; town', Welsh tref 'town'; akin to Asturian truébanu 'beehive', Provençal trevar 'to dwell, live (at)'.
- trogo [m] 'sadness, anxiety, pity', from proto-Celtic *trougos, akin to Old Irish tróg, Irish trogha, Welsh tru 'wretched', Breton tru 'miserable'; cognate of Portuguese truhão, Spanish truhan 'baffoon, jester', French truand 'beggar', Dutch treurig 'sad'.
- trollo [m] 'semicircular rake to move the oven's hot coals'. Bret. troellen, Cornish trolh, Welsh troel, 'idem'. However, Benozzo does not know the phonetic laws of Galician. The expected reflex of Celtic *trullo would be Modern Galician **trolo; trollo can be explained as a regular development from the Latin trulleus 'scoop'.
- turro [m] 'boulder, heap', from a probably Celtic etymon *tūrra 'heap of earth', cognate of Welsh twrr 'heap'.
- vasalo [m] 'vassal' (alternative spelling vassalo), from Vulgar Latin vassalus, from proto-Celtic *wasto-, cognate of French vassal, Spanish vasallo, Middle Irish foss 'servant', Welsh gwas 'servant; lad', Breton gwaz.
- verea [f] 'main road', from the medieval form vereda, from Celtic *uɸo-rēdo-, cognate of Spanish vereda 'pathway'; akin to Welsh gorwydd 'steed', Vulgar Latin veredus 'horse', French palefroi 'steed' (< *para-veredus).

== See also ==
- Galician terms from Proto-Celtic at the Wiktionary.

== Bibliography ==
- Bascuas López, Edelmiro (2006). La Diosa Reve y los trasancos. Estudios Mindonienses (22): 801-842.
- Bascuas López, Edelmiro (2008). La hidronimia de Galicia. Tres estratos: paleoeuropeo, celta y latino. Estudios Mindonienses (24): 521-550.
- Buschmann, Sigrid (1965). Beiträge zum etymologischen Wörterbuch des Galizischen. Bonn: Romanisches Seminar der Univ. Bonn.
- Carvalho Calero, Ricardo (1976). Gramática elemental del gallego común. Galaxia. ISBN 84-7154-037-1. Google Books (in Spanish)
- Coromines, J. (1997). Breve diccionario etimológico de la lengua castellana. Gredos. ISBN 978-84-249-3555-9.
- DCECH = Coromines, Joan; Pascual, José Antonio (2012). Diccionario crítico etimológico castellano e hispánico (Ed. en CD-ROM. ed.). Madrid: Gredos. ISBN 9788424936549.
- Donkin, T. C. (1864). An etymological dictionary of the Romance languages; chiefly from the Germ. of F. Diez. Williams and Norgate. Online at the Internet Archive.
- Grzega, Joachim (2001). Romania Gallica Cisalpina etymologisch-geolinguistische Studien zu den oberitalienisch-rätoromanischen Keltizismen. Tübingen: M. Niemeyer. ISBN 978-3-11-094440-2 – via De Gruyter.
- Mariño Paz, Ramon (1998). Historia da lingua galega. Sotelo Blanco. ISBN 84-7824-333-X.
- Matasovic, R. (2009). Etymological Dictionary of Proto-Celtic. Brill. ISBN 90-04-17336-6.
- Meyer-Lübke, W. (1911). Romanisches etymologisches Wörterbuch. Carl Winter's U. Online at the Internet Archive.
- Moralejo, Juán J. (2007) Callaica Nomina. A Coruña: Fundación Barrié. 2007. ISBN 978-84-95892-68-3.
- Prósper, Blanca María (2002). Lenguas y religiones prerromanas del occidente de la península ibérica. Ediciones Universidad de Salamanca. ISBN 978-84-7800-818-6.
- Rivas Quintas, C.M., Eligio (2015). Dicioniario etimolóxico da lingua galega (1a ed.). Santiago de Compostela: Tórculo. ISBN 978-84-8408-374-0.
- Ward, A. (1996). A Checklist of Proto-Celtic lexical Items. Online at Scribd.

=== Dictionaries ===
- Dicionario de Dicionarios da lingua Galega. (in Galician)
- Dicionario de dicionarios do galego medieval. (in Galician)
