= Galician Academy of the Portuguese Language =

Institution supporting Galician integration into the Lusophony

- Academia Galega da Língua Portuguesa
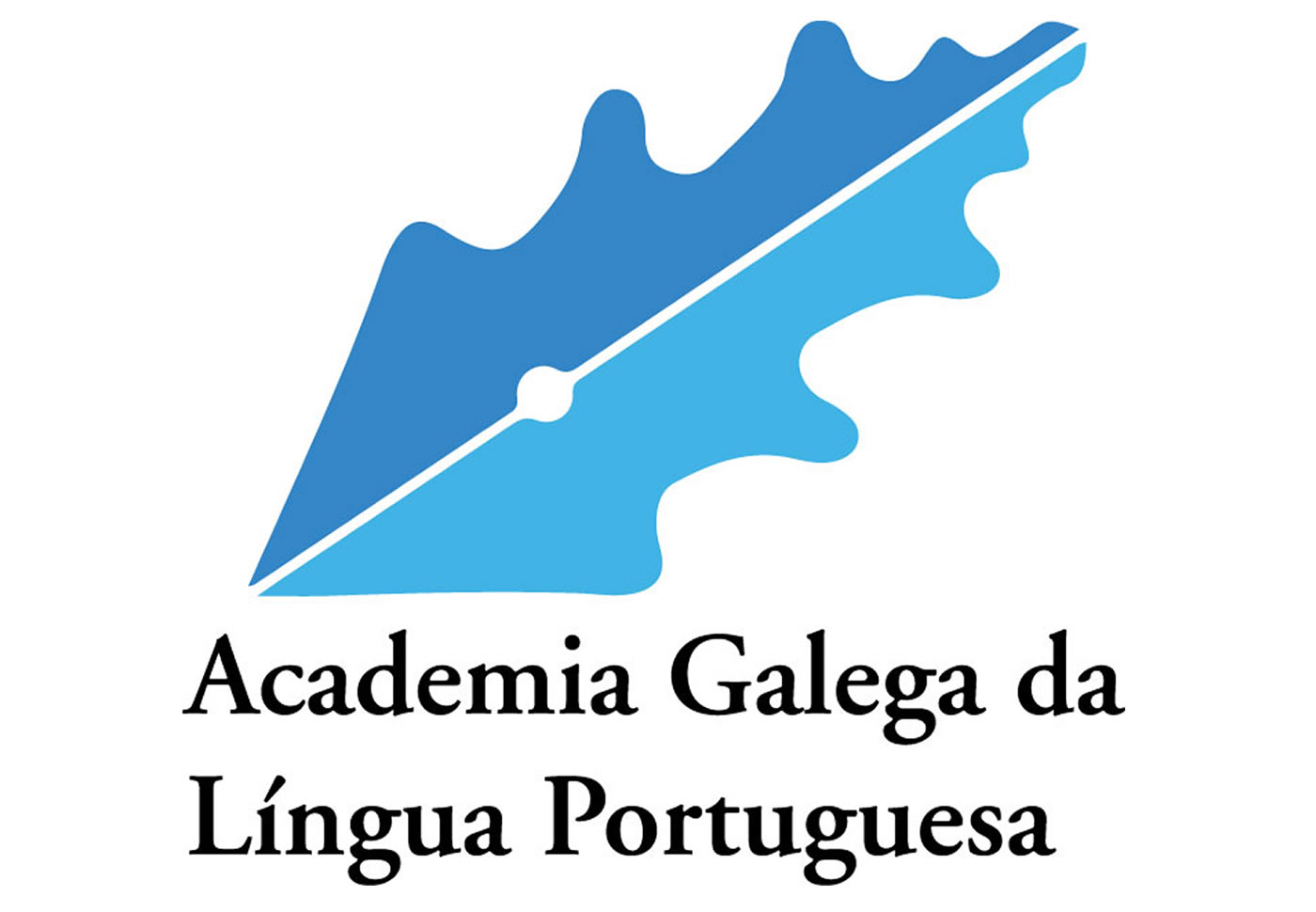
- Formation: 1 December 2008
- Headquarters: Padrón, Galicia
- Official language: Portuguese
- President: Rudesindo Soutelo
- Website: www.academiagalega.org

The Galician Academy of the Portuguese Language (Portuguese: Academia Galega da Língua Portuguesa) or AGLP is a learned institution dedicated to the advancement, study and normalization of Galicia's language. The academy's goal is to promote the study of language and Reintegrationism, the concept that the Galician and Portuguese should be considered one and promote integration within the Lusophony.

== Goals ==
The Academy's goal is to promote the study of the country's language and its integration into the Portuguese Language Orthographic Agreement of 1990. The Academy includes among its promoters some of the Galician delegates that attended the Rio de Janeiro and Lisbon meetings that led to the international treaty.

== Structure ==
The Academy is self-governing and independent, and maintains close ties with the Brazilian Academy of Letters and the Sciences Academy of Lisbon. In 2009 the Galician Academy produced a list of over one thousand words commonly used in Galicia's local language, for introduction into various Portuguese and Brazilian dictionaries and vocabularies.
