= Huelgas Ensemble =

Belgian early music group

- Origin: Belgium
- Genre: early music
- Years active: 1971–present
- Website: www.huelgasensemble

Huelgas Ensemble is a Belgian early music group formed by the Flemish conductor Paul Van Nevel in 1971. The group's performance and extensive discography focuses on Renaissance polyphony. The name of the ensemble refers to a manuscript of polyphonic music, the Codex Las Huelgas.

Van Nevel is noted for his style of performing many pieces with the singers and himself in a large circle, rotating, both in live performances (such as at the Rheingau Musik Festival where the pews had to be unbolted from the floor of the Basilika of Schloss Johannisberg in 2005), and in recordings around the microphone hovering above the center.

In 2009, after 8 years with Harmonia Mundi of Bernard Coutaz, the group returned to the Sony Classical Group which celebrated the occasion with the reissue of a 15CD reissue box.

== Discography ==
- 1977 – Johannes Heer et le chansonnier de Paris. (LP). Alpha 260.
- 1978 – Musique à la Cour de Chypre 1192-1489. (LP). Alpha DB 264.
- 1978 – Netherlands Renaissance. De Monte, Orlando di Lasso, Nörmiger, White. (LP, CD). Sony "Seon" 60705.
- 1978 – Motets Wallons. Motets, Conductus et Pièces Instrumentales. Anon. (LP). Musique en Wallonie MW 29.
- 1979 – Ars Moriendi. Isaac, Cornago, Nörmiger (LP). Alpha 270.
- 1982 – La Favola di Orfeo. Reconstruction of 1494 favola. Pesenti, Tromboncino, Cara, Aquila. Sony Classical, Seon SB2K 60095 (2 LP, 2 CD).
- 1985 – Musica aldersoetste Konst. Polyphonic songs from the Low Countries. Gheerkin De Hondt etc. (LP, CD) Klara MMP 013.
- 1990 – O cieco mondo. The Italian Lauda, c.1400-1700. Landini, Anon.(LP, CD) Deutsche Harmonia Mundi RD77865.
- 1990 – Cypriot Advent Antiphons. Anonymus c.1390. (LP, CD) Deutsche Harmonia Mundi RD77977.
- 1990 – Antoine Brumel: Missa Et ecce terrae motus. Sequentia Dies irae. Sony Classical Vivarte SK 46348.
- 1990 – Cypriano de Rore: Passio Domini nostri Jesu Christi secundum Johannem. Deutsche Harmonia Mundi 7994.
- 1991 – Mateo Flecha el Viejo: Ensaladas; El Fuego, La Negrina, La Justa. Sony Classical Vivarte SK 46699.
- 1991 – La Dissection d'un Homme armé. Six Masses after a Burgundian Song. Sony Classical Vivarte SK 45860.
- 1991 – Italia mia. Musical Imagination in the Renaissance. Philippe Verdelot, Nenna etc. Sony Classical Vivarte SK 48065.
- 1991 – In morte di Madonna Laura. Madrigal cycle after texts of Petrarch. Hoste da Reggio, Pisano, Cimello, etc. Sony Classical Vivarte SK 48942.
- 1992 – Nicolas Gombert: Music from the Court of Charles V. Motets. Chansons. Mass for 6 Voices. Sony Classical Vivarte SK 48249.
- 1992 – Michael Praetorius: Magnificat. Aus tiefer Not; Der Tag vertreibt. Sony Classical Vivarte SK 18039.
- 1992 – Febus Avant! Music at the Court of Gaston Febus. Sony Classical Vivarte SK 48195.
- 1993 – Orlande de Lassus: Lagrime di San Pietro. Sony Classical Vivarte SK 53373.
- 1993 – João Lourenço Rebelo: Vesper Psalms and Lamentations. Sony Classical Vivarte SK 53 115.
- 1993 – Codex Las Huelgas. Music from 13th Century Spain. Sony Classical Vivarte SK 53341.
- 1994 – Music at the Court of king Janus of Nicosia. Ars subtilior of 14thC. Sony Classical Vivarte SK 53976.
- 1994 – Jacobus Gallus: Opus musicum. Missa super "Sancta Maria". Sony Classical Vivarte SK 64305.
- 1994 – Costanzo Festa: Magnificat; Mass parts; Motets; Madrigals. Sony Classical Vivarte SK 53116.
- 1994 – Canções, Vilancicos e Motetes Portugueses: Séculos XVI-XVII. Sony Classical Vivarte SK 64 305.
- 1995 – Utopia Triumphans. First recording of Tallis Spem in alium. Porta à 13, à 14, Josquin Desprez à 24, Ockeghem à 36, Manchicourt à 6, Giovanni Gabrieli à 16, Striggio à 40. Sony Classical Vivarte SK 66261.
- 1996 – Perusio: Virelais, Ballades, Caccia. Sony Classical Vivarte SK 62928.
- 1996 – Matthaeus Pipelare: Missa L'homme armé. Chansons. Motets. Sony Classical Vivarte SK 68258.
- 1996 – Claude le Jeune: Le printemps. Sony Classical Vivarte SK 68259.
- 1997 – Tears of Lisbon. 16th Century works by Manuel Mendes (1547–1605), and works by fadistas Joaquim Pimentel, Fontes Rocha, Paulo Valentim, Armando Machado, Francisco Viana and Fernando Tordo. And traditional fado by guest artists Beatriz da Conceição and António Rocha. Sony Classical Vivarte SK 62256.
- 1997 – Pierre de Manchicourt: Missa Veni Sancte Spiritus. Motets. Chansons. Sony Classical Vivarte SK 62694.
- 1997 – La pellegrina. Music for a Medici wedding. Sony Classical Vivarte S2K 63362.
- 1997 – Johannes Ciconia: Oeuvre complète. Pavane 7345 (3 CD).
- 1998 – Alexander Agricola: A Secret Labyrinth. Sony Classical Vivarte SK 60760.
- 1999 – Lamentations de la Renaissance. Lassus, Orto, White, Massaino. Harmonia Mundi 901682.
- 2000 – Guillaume Dufay: O Gemma Lux. Intégrale des motets isorythmiques. Harmonia Mundi901700.
- 2000 – Christoph Demantius: Vêpres de Pentecoste. Harmonia Mundi 901705.
- 2001 – Two unpublished tracks: Binchois Sanctus, Crecquillon Amour partez, accompanying book.
- 2001 – Le Chant de Virgile. Adrian Willaert, Cipriano de Rore. Secular motets. Harmonia Mundi 901739.
- 2001 – Annibale Padovano: Messe à 24 voix. Harmonia Mundi 901727.
- 2002 – Cipriano de Rore: Missa Praeter rerum seriem. Madrigaux et motets. Harmonia Mundi901760.
- 2003 – Jean Richafort: Requiem (in memoriam Josquin Desprez) à 6 voix, motets. Harmonia Mundi 901730.
- 2003 – Costanzo Festa: La Spagna. 32 contrapunti. (SACD) Harmonia Mundi 801799.
- 2004 – Orlande de Lassus: Il Canzoniere di Messer Francesco Petrarca. Harmonia Mundi 901828. (Awards: 10 de Répertoire, Edison Classical Music Award).
- 2004 – Jacobus de Kerle: "Da Pacem Domine" Messes & Motets. Harmonia Mundi 901866.
- 2005 – Alfonso Ferrabosco the elder "Ferrabosco Il Padre": Psalm 103. Motets et chansons. Harmonia Mundi 901874.
- 2006 – À 40 voix. 2nd recordings of Thomas Tallis Spem in Alium, Striggio, Gabrieli, Desprez. 1st recordings by Huelgas Ensemble of pieces by Comes, Mouton, Robert Wylkynson, Rebelo, and Willem Ceuleers (b. 1962)(SACD). Harmonia Mundi 801954.
- 2007 – La Quinta essentia. Lassus, Palestrina, Thomas Ashwell. Harmonia Mundi 901922.
- 2009 – Michelangelo Rossi: La Poesia Cromatica. Deutsche Harmonia Mundi 7428542
- 2010 – Praebachtorius. DHM 92587799
- 2011 – The Art of the Cigar. Songs by Castro, East, Hetsch, Peyró, Wesley, Riquet, Tozer, Barratt, Lazerges, Lebrun, Solage, Towner, Hume, Walker. DHM
- 2012 – Clemens non Papa. DHM
- 2012 - The Eton Choirbook. DHM
- 2013 – Claude le Jeune The Treasures of Claude le Jeune. DHM
- 2013 – La Oreja de Zurbarán (the ear of Zurbarán) Andrés Barea, Juan Garcia de Salazar, Diego de Pontac, Manuel Machado, Jose de Vaquedano, Mateo Romero, Miguel de Ambiela. Cypres.
- 2015 – Mirabile Mysterium A European Christmas Tale DHM
- 2015 – Le Mystère de "Malheur me bat" Abertijne Malcourt Malheur me bat etc. DHM
- 2015 – L'Héritage de Petrus Alamire Johannes Sticheler excerpts from Missa se j'avoye porpoin de veleur etc. Cypres
- 2026 - PARIS 1200: École de Notre-Dame. Musica Ficta
