= List of fado musicians =

This is a list of fado musicians.

== Singers ==
- Mafalda Arnauth
- Cristina Branco
- Camané
- Carminho
- Carlos do Carmo
- Beatriz da Conceição
- Rouxinol Faduncho (Marco Horácio)
- Fernando Farinha
- Luís Goes
- Katia Guerreiro
- Gisela João
- Alfredo Marceneiro
- Fernanda Maria
- Mariza
- Fernando Maurício
- Maja Milinković
- Mísia
- Ana Moura
- Maria da Nazaré
- Maria Teresa de Noronha
- Adriano Correia de Oliveira
- Maria Severa Onofriana
- Joaquim Pimentel
- Dulce Pontes
- António Rocha
- Germano Rocha
- Amália Rodrigues
- Celeste Rodrigues
- Cuca Roseta
- Sonia Shirsat
- Hermínia Silva
- Fernando Machado Soares
- Maximiano de Sousa
- Raquel Tavares
- António Zambujo

== Guitarists ==
- Armandinho
- António Chainho
- Carlos Chainho
- Pedro Jóia
- Artur Paredes
- Carlos Paredes
- Paulo Valentim
- Francisco Viana
