= De Hondt =

Dutch surname

De Hondt is a Dutch surname. "De Hondt" is an old spelling of Dutch de hond ("the dog"). In the 16th and 17th century it has been variably Latinized as Hondius, Canis and Canisius.† Contracted forms of the surname are D'Hondt and Dhondt. People with the name De Hondt include:

De Hondt

- Cornelius de Hondt (c.1505–1562), Flemish composer, singer, and choir director better known as Cornelius Canis
- Gheerkin de Hondt (died 1547), Dutch composer of polyphonic songs
- Hendrik de Hondt
  - Hendrik Hondius I (1573–1650), Flemish-Dutch engraver and cartographer, better known as Hendrik Hondius or Henricus Hondius
  - Henricus Hondius II (1597–1651), Dutch engraver, cartographer, publisher; son of Joost de Hondt, better known as Henricus Hondius
  - Henricus Canisius (1562–1610), Dutch historian, better known as Henricus Canisius
- Joost de Hondt (1563–1612), Flemish engraver and cartographer better known as Jodocus Hondius
- Lambert de Hondt the Elder (Lambert de Hondt (I), c.1620–1665), Flemish painter and draughtsman
- Lambert de Hondt the Younger (Lambert de Hondt (II), 1642–1709), Flemish painter and tapestry designer
- Philippe de Hondt (1663–1740), Flemish painter

De Hond

- Maurice de Hond (born 1947), Dutch pollster and entrepreneur
- Meijer de Hond (1882–1943), Dutch Jewish theologian

Dehond

- Joren Dehond (born 1995), Belgian footballer

== See also ==
- Dhondt
- D'Hondt
- Hondius

== Notes ==
† Saint Peter Canisius (1521–1597), his half-brother Theodorich Canisius (1532–1606) and nephew Henricus Canisius (1562–1610) were themselves not known by the name de Hond(t). Their family had carried the (Latinized) name Canis since the early 15th-century.
