= Hondius (disambiguation) =

Hondius is the name of two unrelated families of cartographers.

Hondius may also refer to:

== People ==
- Hondius (patrician family), see List of Dutch patrician families
- Hondt (surname), a Flemish surname that is latinized as Hondius
- Dhondt (surname), a Flemish surname that is latinized as Hondius
- D'Hondt (surname), a Flemish surname that is latinized as Hondius
- de Hondt (surname), a Flemish surname that is latinized as Hondius

=== Persons ===
- Abraham Hondius (ca. 1631–1691), Dutch Golden Age painter
- Gerrie Hondius, Dutch comic book artist; see List of female comics creators
- Henricus Hondius (disambiguation), multiple people
- Jacomina Hondius (1558–1628), Flemish-Dutch calligrapher, sister of Jodocus Hondius
- Willem Alexander Hondius, 21st century airline executive

== Places ==
- Hondius Inlet, Joerg Peninsula, Bowman Coast, Antarctic Peninsula, Antarctica
- 457248 Hondius, the asteroid Hondius, a main-belt asteroid, the 457248th asteroid registered

== Other uses ==
- MV Hondius, a polar-rated expedition cruise ship operated by Oceanwide Expeditions
- MV Hondius hantavirus outbreak (2026), a viral disease outbreak aboard the cruise ship Hondius

== See also ==
- Daneila Hondiu, Romanian martial artist, who took bronze at the 2014 World Sambo Championships and 2015 European Games
