= Michele Pesenti =

Italian composer and lutenist

To be distinguished from the blind keyboard composer Martino Pesenti, (Venice, c. 1600 – c. 1648)

Michele Pesenti (Verona ca. 1470–after 1524) was an Italian composer and lutenist who served the House of Este at Ferrara. Pesenti was one of the most lively and inventive of the so-called frottola composers, including Marchetto Cara and Bartolomeo Tromboncino.

== Selected recordings ==
- "Ha' tu veduto un mio vitellin bianco" on La Favola di Orfeo 1494, reconstruction of a Florentine entertainment, by Huelgas Ensemble, dir. Paul Van Nevel. Seon.
- frottola: "Non mi doglio gia d'amore" on Banchetti Musicali a la Corte Estense. by La Bottega musicale Ferrarese. Bongiovanni GB 5001 (LP) 1985
- frottola: "Dal lecto me levava" on Barzellette - Frottole Italiane del Cinquecento. by Retrover dir. Markus Tapio, Opus111 30-243 1998
- villota: "Quando lo pomo vien da lo pomaro" on Cantar alla Pavana Canzoni, Frottole, Villotte e Madrigali dell'Apografo Miscellaneo Marciano (1526) (music from fragments in the Marciana Library, Venice) by Consort Veneto dir. Giovanni Toffano, Tactus 520002
- "Alhor quando arivava" on Cigni, Capre, Galli e Grilli. by Fortuna Ensemble dir. Roberto Cascio, Tactus 460301 1998
- instrumental: "Un cavalier di Spagna" on Musica dell'epoca di Cristoforo Colombo
- "Che faralla che diralla - Uscirallo, resterallo" on Luther in Rom by Concerto Romano dir. Alessandro Quarta, Christophorus Records CHR 77361 2012
