= Filippo de Lurano =

Italian composer

Filippo de Lurano (also Luprano, or Lorano) (c. 1475 – after 1520) was an Italian composer of the Renaissance. He was one of the most prolific composers of frottola after Marchetto Cara and Bartolomeo Tromboncino.

== Biography ==
Of his early life, almost nothing is known: the few sources we have range from attributing his birthplace to the Istrian peninsula to Lurano, which at the time was under the diocese of Cremona, to Cremona itself. He appears in the records of Cividale del Friuli's Cathedral, near Udine, as a cleric. De Lurano spent time in Rome in the first decade of the 16th century, but the exact years are not known; he wrote music for a wedding of the niece of Pope Julius II in 1508. From 1512 to 1515 he was employed as maestro de cappella of Cividale Cathedral, and shortly afterwards moved to Aquileia, where he may have died.

== Works ==
Most of his music is in the light secular form of the frottola, an ancestor of the madrigal. 35 of his frottole survive, along with two motets and a lauda. Stylistically they are typical of the time: homophonic texture predominates, with brief imitative passages at phrase beginnings; the melodies are memorable and easily singable.

One of his frottola was evidently the favorite song of Cesare Borgia, the son of Pope Alexander VI, according to a manuscript source of the time.

== References and further reading ==
- William F. Prizer, "Filippo de Lurano," in The New Grove Dictionary of Music and Musicians, ed. Stanley Sadie. 20 vol. London, Macmillan Publishers Ltd., 1980. ISBN 1-56159-174-2
- Gustave Reese, Music in the Renaissance. New York, W.W. Norton & Co., 1954. ISBN 0-393-09530-4
