= Katia Guerreiro =

South African-born Portuguese fado singer

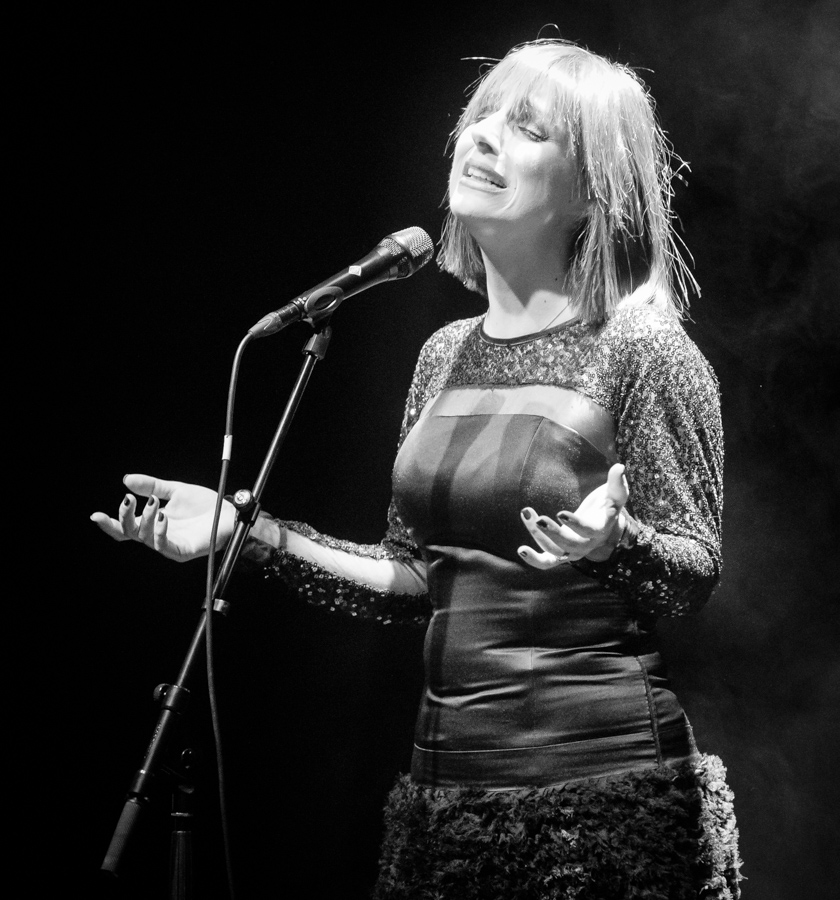
- Katia Guerreiro in Oslo in 2018

Background information
- Born: Katia Duarte d'Almeida d'Oliveira Rosado Guerreiro; 23 February 1976 (age 50); Vanderbijlpark, Transvaal, South Africa
- Years active: 2000-present
- Website: katiaguerreiro.com

Katia Guerreiro (born 23 February 1976) is a South African-born Portuguese fado singer, who has released eight albums and has received several awards, including Order of Arts and Letters, Chevalier rank, from the French government and the Order of Prince Henry from the President of Portugal.

== Life ==
Guerreiro was born Katia Duarte d'Almeida d'Oliveira Rosado Guerreiro in Vanderbijlpark, Transvaal, South Africa. to Portuguese parents. Soon after her birth, her family returned to São Miguel Island in the Azores, where she grew up.

At age 15, she learned to play a local type of instrument called violin da terra, traditional in the Azores, and began playing with a band called Rancho Folclórico de Santa Cecília. After high school, she was accepted into medical school in Lisbon, where she graduated in 2000. During this time, she sang with the group Tuna Médica and with the Miguel Torga theater group at her school, along with a rock band called Os Charruas.

Her fado career began in 2000, but she still works part-time as a doctor at a hospital near Lisbon. She has campaigned against abortion in Portugal, considering it against her medical ethics.

Guerreiro married photographer Rui Ochôa in 2004, but the couple divorced in 2010. She had her first child, a daughter named Mafalda, in 2012 in Lisbon with Jorge Faustino. The album she recorded after this event contains a lullaby dedicated to this child.

== Career ==
Her professional career began in the fall of 2000, when she went on stage at an event to honor fado singer Amália Rodrigues in Lisbon. There, she was discovered by fado musicians Paulo Parreira and Mário José Veiga, who were in the audience.

Her first album was Fado Maior (2001) which won the José Afonso Award and was a hit in South Korea. This was followed by Nas maos do fado (2003), with tracks by Luis de Camões, Florbela Espanca, Ary dos Santos and António Lobo Antunes. This work received a nomination for the Jose Afonso Award. In 2005, she recorded a duet with Brazilian artist Martinho da Vila on the album Brasilatinidade, and released a third album, Tudo ou nada, with lyrics by Vinicius de Moraes, Sophia de Mello Breyner and Antonio Lobo Antunes and others. Pianist Bernardo Sassetti also collaborated on the song Minha Senhora das Dores. The album was reissued in 2006, adding two duets with Nay Matogrosso. Fados do Fado (2008/2009) is mostly traditional fado, with covers of songs by Tony de Matos, Max, Tristão da Silva, Hermínia Silva, Teresa Silva Carvalho, João Ferreira-Rosa, and Amália Rodrigues. In 2010, she released a greatest hits album called 10 anos-nas asas do fado, followed by a live album, Katia-Live at the Olympia (CD/DVD) was recorded in 2012 at the Olympia in Paris.

About ninety percent of Guerreiro’s performances are outside of Portugal. In 2005 she participated in the Rencontres pour l’Europe de la Culture at the Comédie-Française in Paris, after with she was nominated to be a member of the European Cultural Parliament. In 2009, she was invited to perform with L' Ensemble Baja Normandía, and toured ten cities in France, then did some concerts in Portugal. She has performed at the Olympia Theater in Paris and the La Pedrera Theater in Barcelona, and festivals such as the Festival Internacional Cervantino in 2014 and the Feria Internacional del Libro de Bogotá in 2015.

The singer has appeared on documentaries and television shows in both Portugal and abroad. She appeared several times as herself on the television series Só Visto! (2013, 2014, 2015), Há Tarde (2014), Herman 2010 (2010, 2013), Você na TV! (2013), Nico à Noite (2011), Companhia das Manhãs (2011), 5 Para a Meia Noite (2010), Uma Canção Para Ti (2009), Há Conversa (2009), Sexta à Noite (2008), Fados de Portugal (2000), along with the documentary Heaven's Mirror: A Portuguese Voyage (2011) and the televisión movie Natal dos Hospitais 1996.

== Recognition ==
She is not as well known as other new fado singers such as Mariza, because of the lack of promotion and major label backing, but her work has received important awards. In 2006, at the commemoration of the Carnation Revolution, she was designated one the thirty most important people of her generation. In 2010 she received the Best Performer of Fado award from the Amália Rodrigues Foundation. In 2012, she received the Order of Arts and Letters, Chevalier rank from the French government. In 2015, she received the Comenda da Ordem do Infante D. Henrique from the Portuguese president, along with Ana Moura, Carminho, Ricardo Ribeiro and Mario Pacheco.

== Musical style ==
Guerreiro says that "fado sings life" and not just tragedy, and that it can cure the souls of the people. Her take on fado is very traditional, and uses only the three traditional instruments: 12-stringed Portuguese guitar, Spanish guitar and double bass. New songs are composed by her Portuguese guitarists Paulo Valentim and João Viega, as well as the singer occasionally. However, the new works are very similar in sound to the traditional ones. She does update traditional fados by using the words of Portuguese poets. One example of this is Ancorado en Mim, which takes the melody of Santa Lucia and matches it with a poem by Ana Vidal.

Like all current female fado singers, she is compared to 20th century fado singer Amália Rodrigues. In Guerreiro's her tone and range are similar to Rodrigues. On stage, she is almost static, usually singing with eyes closed and her hands clenched behind her back, the position she is shown on her second album.

== Discography ==
=== Fado Maior (2001) ===
1. "Asas" (3:30) (Maria Luisa Baptista/Georgino de Sousa (fado Georgino))
2. "Algemas" (3:23) (Álvaro Duarte Simões)
3. "Amor de mel, amor de fel" (3:08) (Amália Rodrigues/Carlos Gonçalves)
4. "As rosas / promessa" (2:03) (Sophia Mello Breyner/João Mário Veiga)
5. "Guitarra triste" (2:47) (Álvaro Duarte Simões)
6. "Avé Maria (3:37)" (Fernando Pessoa/João Mário Veiga)
7. "Incerteza (2:00)" (João Mário Veiga/Miguel Ramos (fado alberto))
8. "Asa de vento (3:23)" (Amália Rodrigues/Carlos Gonçalves)
9. "É noite na mouraria" (2:25) (José Maria Rodrigues/António Mestre)
10. "Minha Lisboa de mim" (3:49) (Nuno Gomes dos Santos/Silvestre Fonseca)
11. "A Mariquinhas vai à fonte" (2:24) (Maria Manuel Cid/Música popular)
12. "Esquina de um tempo" (3:00) (Maria Luisa Baptista/Paulo Parreira e Katia Guerreiro)

=== Nas Mãos do Fado (2003) ===
1. "Os meus versos" (Florbela Espanca/Paulo Valentim (guitarist))
2. "Valsa" (António Lobo Antunes/Miguel Ramos (fado margaridas))
3. "Dança das Sete Luas" (Ana Vidal/João Veiga)
4. "Vodka e Valium 10" (António Lobo Antunes/Armando Machado (fado fé))
5. "Segredos" (Paulo Valentim (guitarist)
6. "O teu encanto" (João Veiga)
7. "Ancorado em mim" (Ana Vidal/Armando Machado (fado santa luzia))
8. "Perdigão" (Luís Vaz de Camões/Alain Oulman)
9. "O que fôr há-de ser" (Dulce Pontes)
10. "Rosa Vermelha" (José Carlos Ary dos Santos/Alain Oulman)
11. "Recado" (António Lobo Antunes/Katia Guerreiro e João Veiga)
12. "Voz do Vento" (Maria Luísa Baptista/ fado menor (dr))
13. "Romper Madrugadas" (Paulo Valentim (guitarist)/Paulo Valentim (guitarist) e João Veiga)
14. "Meu principezinho" (Katia Guerreiro/fado joão maria dos anjos (sextilhas))
15. "Chora, Mariquinhas chora" (Amália Rodrigues/José Fontes Rocha)

=== Tudo ou Nada (2005) ===
1. "Disse-te adeus à partida, o mar acaba ao teu lado (4:34)" (António Lobos Antunes/SPA)
2. "Despedida" (2:55) (António Calém/SPA))
3. "Ser tudo ou nada" (3:01) (João Veiga/SPA)
4. "Muda tudo, até o mundo" (1:32) (Maria Luísa Baptista/SPA)
5. "Minha Senhora das Dores" (3:51) (Jorge Rosa/Paulo Valentim (guitarist))
6. "Canto da fantasia" (3:19) (Paulo Valentim (guitarist))
7. "Vaga" (2:53) (Rodrigo Serrão/SPA)
8. "Dulce caravela" (2:59) (Dulce Pontes)
9. "Quando" (3:09) (Sophia de Mello Breyner/SPA)
10. "Menina do alto da Serra" (2:42) (José Carlos Ary dos Santos/SPA)
11. "Saudades do Brasil em Portugal" (4:00) (Vinicius de Moraes)
12. "O meu navio" (2:08) (Rodrigo Serrão/SPA)
13. "Talvez não saibas" (4:32) (Joaquim Pessoa/SPA)
14. "Tenho uma saia rodada" (1:36) (Maria Luísa Baptista/SPA)
15. "Menina do alto da Serra" - faixa bónus, participação especial de Ney Matogrosso (2:53) (Nuno Nazaré Fernandes/Ary dos Santos/SPA)
16. "Lábios de mel" - faixa bónus, participação especial de Ney Matogrosso (3:17) (Waldir Rocha/PEERMUSIC)

=== Fado (2008) ===
1. "Fado dos olhos" (Florbela Espanca/Carlos Ramos (Fado das Horas — pop))
2. "Pranto de amor ausente" (Paulo Valentim (guitarist))
3. "A voz da poesia" (Katia Guerreiro/Rui Veloso)
4. "Ponham flores na mesa" (Fernando Tavares Rodrigues/Joaquim Campos Silva (Fado Tango))
5. "Estranha paixão" (João Veiga/Pedro Pinhal)
6. "Casa da colina" (Maria Luísa Baptista/Rodrigo Serrão)
7. "A cidade saudade" (Rodrigo Serrão/Casimiro Ramos (Fado Três Bairros))
8. "A nossa gente, o nosso fado" (Rodrigo Serrão/Mário Pacheco)
9. "Renasce" (João Veiga)
10. "Lírio roxo" (António Gedeão/Francisco Viana (Fado Vianinha))
11. "Poema da malta das naus" (António Gedeão/Paulo Valentim (guitarist))
12. "Mundo" (Fernando Tavares Rodrigues/Júlio Proença (Fado Esmeraldinha))
13. "Lisboa" (Charles Aznavour)
14. "Eu queria cantar-te um fado" (António de Sousa Freitas/Franklin Godinho (Fado Franklin de Sextilhas))

=== Os Fados Do Fado (2009) ===
1. Vira dos Malmequeres
2. Arraial
3. A Rosinha dos Limões
4. Agora Choro à Vontade
5. Lisboa à Noite
6. Procuro e Não Te Encontro
7. Fado da Sina
8. Nem às Paredes Confesso
9. Gaivota
10. O Namorico da Rita
11. Há Festa na Mouraria
12. Amar

=== Até Ao Fim (2014) ===
1. 9 amores
2. Mentiras
3. Até ao fim
4. Disse ao mar que te amava
5. Janela do meu peito
6. Fado dos contrários
7. Fado da noite que nos fez
8. Quero cantar para a Lua
9. Sei que estou só
10. Nesta noite
11. As quatro operações
12. Eu gosto tanto de ti - Canção para a Mafalda
