= Germano =

Germano is a masculine given name and a surname. Notable people with the name include:

== Mononym ==
- Germano (footballer, born 1911), Germano Boettcher Sobrinho (1911–1977), Brazilian goalkeeper
- Germano (footballer, born 1942), José Germano de Sales (1942–1997), Brazilian left winger
- Germano (footballer, born 1981), Germano Borovicz Cardozo Schweger, Brazilian defensive midfielder

== Given name ==
- Germano Almeida (born 1945), Cape Verdean author and lawyer
- Germano Celant (1940–2020), Italian art historian, critic and curator
- Germano de Figueiredo (1932–2004), Brazilian footballer
- Germano Grachane (born 1942), Mozambican clergyman
- Germano Martins, American politician
- Germano Mosconi (1932–2012), Italian sportswriter, news presenter and television personality
- Germano Rigotto (born 1949), Brazilian politician
- Germano Rocha, Portuguese-born Canadian fado singer and restaurant owner
- Germano Vailati (born 1980), Swiss footballer

== Surname ==
- Carlos Germano (born 1970), Brazilian footballer
- David Germano, American Tibetologist
- Eddie Germano (1924–2026), American cartoonist
- Elio Germano (born 1980), Italian actor
- Isabelle M. Germano, American neurosurgeon
- Jonatan Germano (born 1988), Argentine-Australian footballer
- Justin Germano (born 1982), American baseball player
- Lisa Germano (born 1958), American singer-songwriter
- Peter B. Germano (1913–1983), American author
- Umberto Germano (born 1992), Italian footballer
