= António Rocha (fado singer) =

Portuguese fado singer (born 1938)

- Born: June 20, 1938 (age 87); Belém, Lisbon
- Occupation: Fado singer

António Domingos Abreu Rocha (born 20 June 1938 in Belém, Lisbon) is a Portuguese fado singer. He recorded with Beatriz da Conceição for Paul Van Nevel with the Huelgas Ensemble.
