= Manuel Machado (composer) =

Portuguese composer

Manuel Machado (c. 1590–1646) was a Portuguese composer and harpist. He was mostly active in Spain, as he was born when the kingdoms of Portugal and Spain were in a dynastic union.

== Life ==
Manuel Machado was born in Lisbon and studied at the Claustra college of the Lisbon Cathedral with the renowned composer Duarte Lobo. He moved to Spain and in 1610 he became a musician of the royal chapel in Madrid, where his father, Lope Machado, was already a harpist. In 1639, he became a musician in the palace of Philip IV of Spain, and in 1642, he was rewarded "for his long years of service".

== Work ==
Machado composed several sacred works, but he is better known for his secular 3- and 4-voice cantigas and romances in Mannerist style. Unfortunately, very few of his works have survived (most of them were destroyed during the 1755 Lisbon earthquake).

His secular music is characterised by great skill in the flexible use of the meter and harmony to reflect the content of the poems. Machado's highly expressive word-painting, with rich chromatism, unexpected modulation and dissonant chords (such as augmented chords or inverted seventh chords, which would have caused considerable impact in his own time), associated with typical Petrarchan love lyrics, make his romances comparable in style and quality to the Italian late-period madrigals, such as those of Marenzio or Monteverdi.

His known compositions are found in the most important songbooks of his time, such as the Cancionero de la Sablonara, which indicates that he probably enjoyed a considerable popularity. He died in Madrid.

== Recordings ==
The following recordings include works by Machado:

- 1989 - O Lusitano - Portuguese vilancetes, cantigas and romances. Gérard Lesne and Circa 1500. Virgin Veritas 59071. Track 2 "Dos estrellas le siguen", and Track 21 "Paso a paso, empeños mios"
- 1994 - Canções, Vilancicos e Motetes Portugueses. Paul Van Nevel and Huelgas Ensemble. Sony Classical SK 66288. Track 2 "Qué bien siente Galatea", and Track 3 "Dos estrellas le siguen".
- 2007 - Entremeses del siglo de oro - Lope de Vega y su tiempo (1550-1650). Hespèrion XX and Jordi Savall. Alia Vox. Track 12 "Que bien siente Galatea", and Track 17 "¡Afuera, afuera! que sale"
- 2007 - Flores de Lisboa - Canções, vilancicos e romances portugueses. A Corte Musical and Rogério Gonçalves. Le Couvent K617195. Track 1 "Dos estrellas le siguen", Track 2 "Paso a paso, empeños mios", and Track 8 "¡Afuera, afuera! que sale"
