= Canisius =

Canisius may refer to:

== People ==
- Saint Peter Canisius (1521–1597), Dutch Jesuit Catholic priest
- Theodorich Canisius (1532–1606), Jesuit academic, half-brother of St. Peter Canisius
- Henricus Canisius (1562–1610), Dutch canonist and historian, nephew of St. Peter Canisius
- Aegidius of Viterbo (Ægidius Canisius), Italian humanist and cardinal
- Canisius Thekkekara (1914–1998), Syrian Catholic priest

== Schools ==
- Canisius College, a Jesuit college in Buffalo, New York
  - Canisius Golden Griffins, the sports teams of Canisius College
- Canisius High School, a Jesuit private high school in Buffalo, New York
- Jakarta Canisius College, a Jesuit junior and senior high school in Jakarta, Indonesia
