= Tomaso Cimello =

Italian composer

Giovanni Tommaso Cimello (c. 1510 in Monte San Giovanni Campano – c. 1591 in Monte San Giovanni Campano) was a poet, musician, composer, and musical theorist employed by the Colonna family and active at the Aragonese Corts in Naples.

== Works ==
- Canzoni Villanesche al Modo Napolitano a 3 voci, a 1545 collection of villanelle, one of the earliest following that by Nola (1541), and preceding those by Willaert (1545), and Donati (1550)
- 1st Book of Madrigals for 4 voices, a 1548 work dedicated to Fabrizio Colonna

== Selected recordings ==
- Villanelle on Napolitane. Tesori di Napoli Vol.7 Ensemble Micrologus, Cappella della Pietà de' Turchini. Opus111
- Madrigal "fuggi'l sereno" on In morte de Madonna Laura. Huelgas Ensemble, dir. Paul Van Nevel.
