= D'Hondt =

D'Hondt is a Dutch surname, most common in East Flanders. Variants are D'Hont, De Hondt and Dhondt. D'Hondt is an old spelling of de hond ("the dog"). The Honte was also the name of the bay that is now the Eastern end of the Western Scheldt. People with this name include:

D'Hondt

- Brooke D'Hondt (born 2005), Canadian snowboarder
- Danica d'Hondt (born 1939), English-born Canadian actress, writer and businesswoman
- Daniël D'Hondt (born 1961), Belgian football goalkeeper
- Eddie D'Hondt (born 1959), American NASCAR driver; owner of the D'Hondt Humphrey Motorsports team
- Gillian d'Hondt (born 1982), Canadian-American basketball player
- Paula D'Hondt (1926–2022), Belgian politician, Minister of State in 1992
- Steven D'Hondt (born 1960s), American marine microbiologist
- Victor D'Hondt (1841–1901), Belgian lawyer, jurist and mathematician
  - Named after him: D'Hondt method, a method for allocating political seats
- Walter D'Hondt (1936–2021), Canadian rower

D'Hont

- Pieter d'Hont (1917–1997), Dutch sculptor

== See also ==
- Hondius
- De Hondt
- Dhondt
