= Fritz Dietrich =

German musicologist and composer

Fritz Dietrich (13 February 1905 – January 1945) was a German musicologist and composer.

== Biography ==
Dietrich was born in Pforzheim. After his secondary education there, he attended the Karlsruhe Institute of Technology for one semester, before moving to music. He studied from 1925 in Freiburg with Wilibald Gurlitt and Heinrich Besseler. Later study saw him move to Heidelberg University, where Besseler had moved. For a short time, Dietrich studied in Leipzig at the conservatory, under Karl Straube.

From 1931 to 1934, Dietrich took a music assistantship in Heidelberg, whilst training to teach at university level. This he did in 1935, but with the Nazi regime strengthening its grip on the German society, working opportunities for music teachers dwindled.

Between 1935 and 1944 Dietrich worked for the Bärenreiter publishing house in Kassel, and himself published a collection of small notebooks with music for laymen. He was conscripted into the army, and in January 1945 went missing on the Eastern front in the area around Heiligenbeil (now Mamonovo in Kaliningrad Oblast, Russia) at the start of the East Prussian offensive by the Red Army.

Dietrich's known works were written for organ and recorder as well as much vocal music. He was an able player of the piano, organ, oboe and viola.

== Works ==
(BA = Bärenreiter-Ausgabe)

Compositions:

- Zehn kleine Märsche [Ten little marches] for two unison recorders. BA 859.
- Vierzehn kleine Spielradel for two recorders in fifth interval. BA 864.
- Sonatine in C for recorder and piano. BA 980.
- Zehn kleine Walzer [Ten little waltzes] for two unison recorders. BA 1035.
- Wenn alle Brünnlein fließen, variations for two choir recorders and alto recorder. BA 1254.
- Drei kleine Suiten for two choir recorders and alto recorder. BA 1255.
- Elemente der Orgelchoralimprovisation [Elements of organ improvisation]
- Die kleine Lerche (The little lark]

Writings:

- Geschichte des deutschen Orgelchorals im 17. Jahrhundert [History of the German organ chorale in the 17th century] (1932)
- Musik und Zeit [Music and time] (1933)
- Analogieformen in Bachs Tokkaten und Präludien für die Orgel. Bach-Jahrbuch [Analogous forms in Bach's toccatas and preludes for organ] (1931) 51–71

Collections edited by Dietrich for Bärenreiter publishing house:

- Heinrich Albert. Lieder for one voice and accompaniment by keyboard or lute. (editor, 1932). BA 569
- Der Hohenfriedberger and other old marches for piano four hands. BA 1001.
- Laterne, Laterne, Sonne, Mond und Sterne, folk nursery songs in very simple settings for piano. BA 1003.
- Unsere Weihnachtslieder to be sung at the piano, with one melody instrument (flute, violin) ad libitum. BA 1004.
- Altdeutsche Tanzmusik aus Nörmigers Tabulatur 1598 set for C-recorder (or another melody instrument) and piano. (1937) BA 1010.
- Kleines Hirtenbüchel auf die Weihnacht to sing and play for soprano and alto recorder. (1937) BA 1106.
- Gesellige Lieder from German folk heritage, to be sung at the piano, with one melody instrument (flute, violin) ad libitum. BA 1141.

== See also ==
- List of people who disappeared
