= Château de Beaumont =

Former castle of the Croÿ family in Beaumont, Belgium

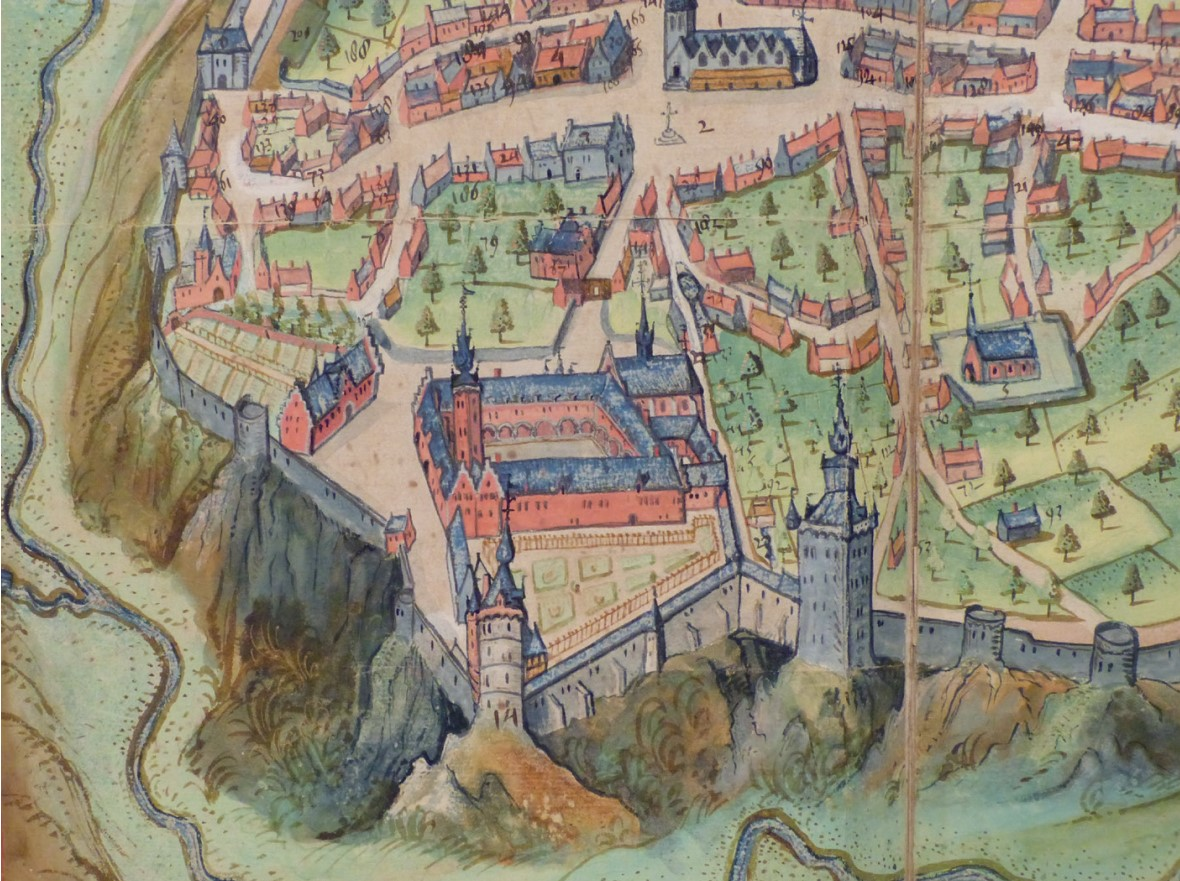
Detail of a 1606 city plan of Beaumont by Pierre or Jacques de Bersacques depicting the château de Beaumont with the Salamander tower on the right

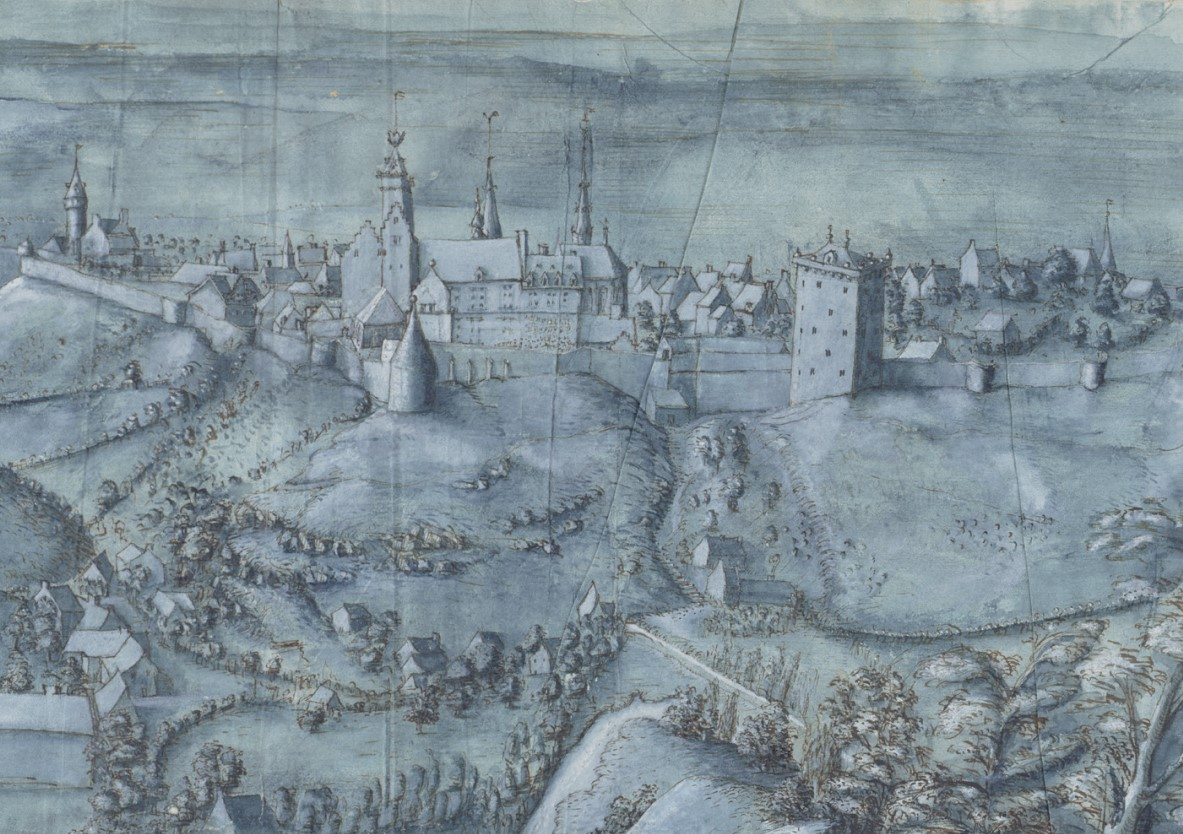
The so-called blue view from 1600 depicting the château de Beaumont with the Salamander tower on the right

The Château de Beaumont (French: Château de Beaumont or Dutch: Kasteel van Beaumont) was a castle in Beaumont, Belgium. In the 15th century, it became the main seat of the House of Croÿ, dukes of Aarschot. They turned the castle fortress into a palatial renaissance structure of unparalleled luxury and magnificence. The palace had its heyday under prince-duke Charles III de Croÿ, an avid collector, who filled its halls and galleries with an outstanding art collection. In 1655, the castle was destroyed by the French army of Turenne. Nowadays, only one tower remains of the complex, the Salamander tower (French: Tour Salamandre or Dutch: Salamandertoren). It is opened to the public and tells the story of a bygone time.

== History ==
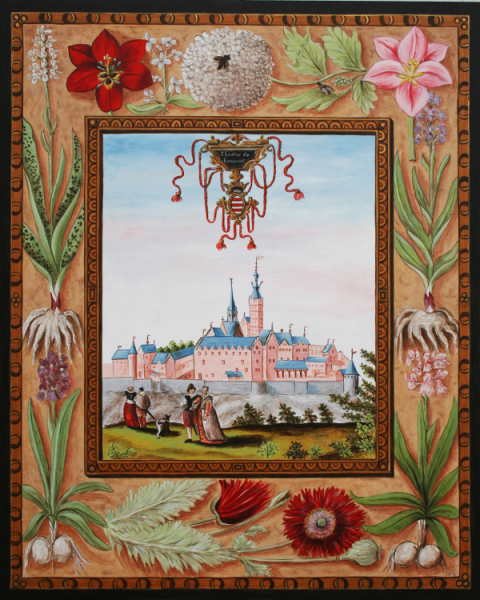
The château de Beaumont in the Albums de Croÿ

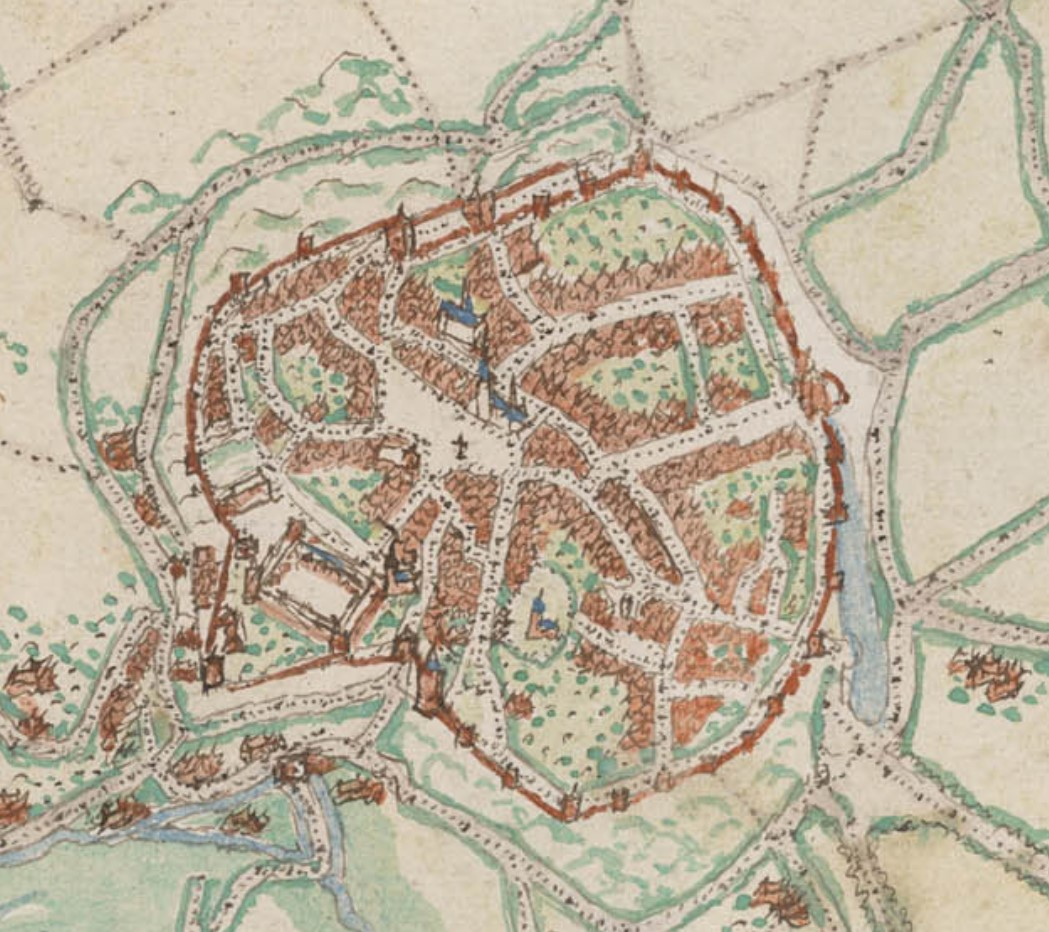
A 1545 map by Jacob van Deventer depicting Beaumont with the castle in the left corner below

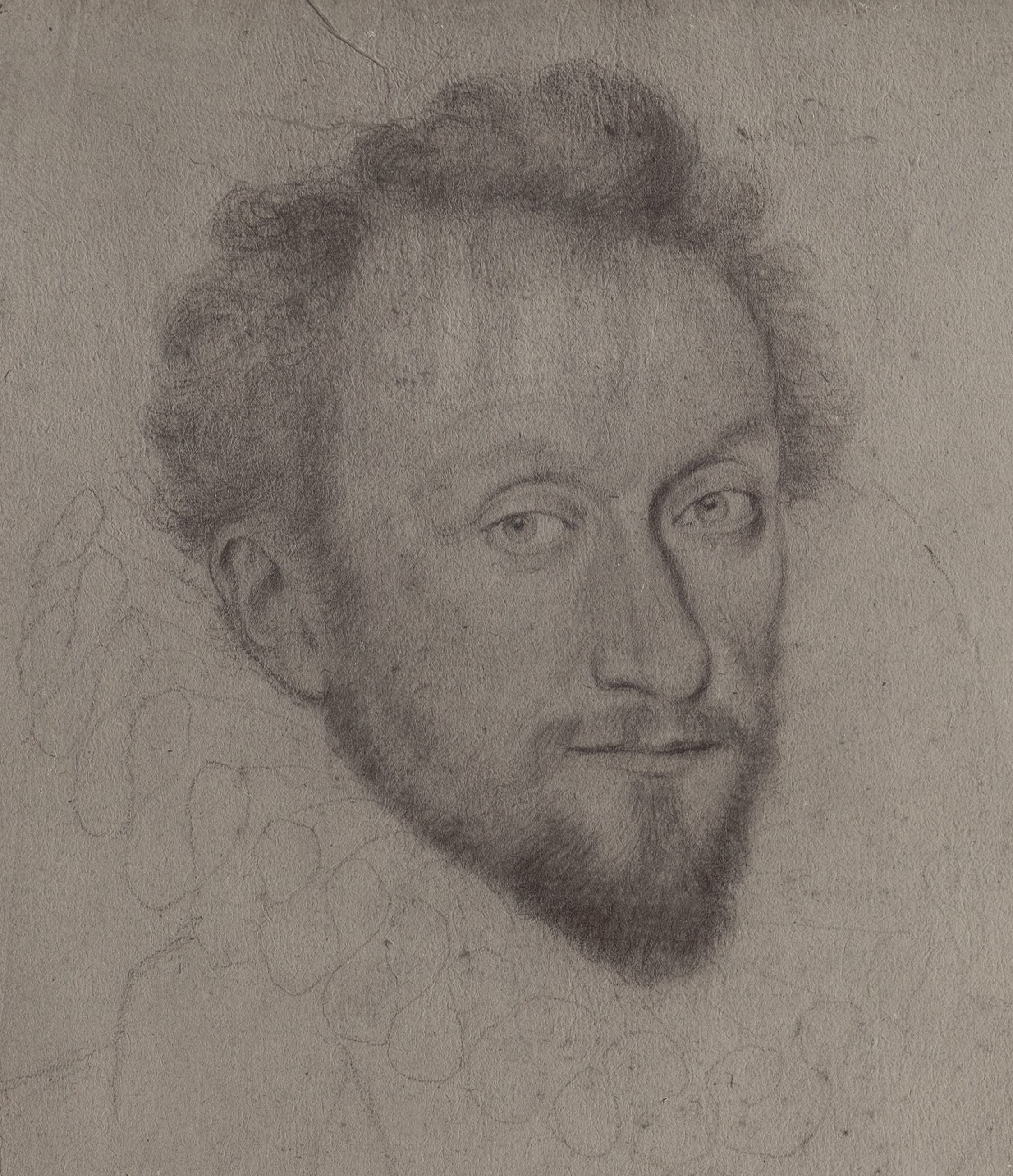
Charles III de Croÿ

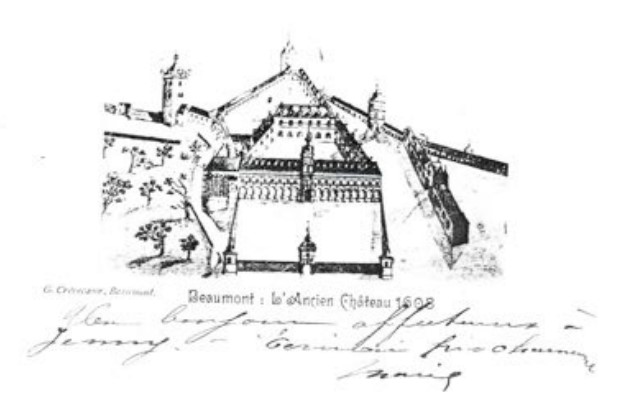
A 1608 depiction of the Château de Beaumont on a 19th-century post card

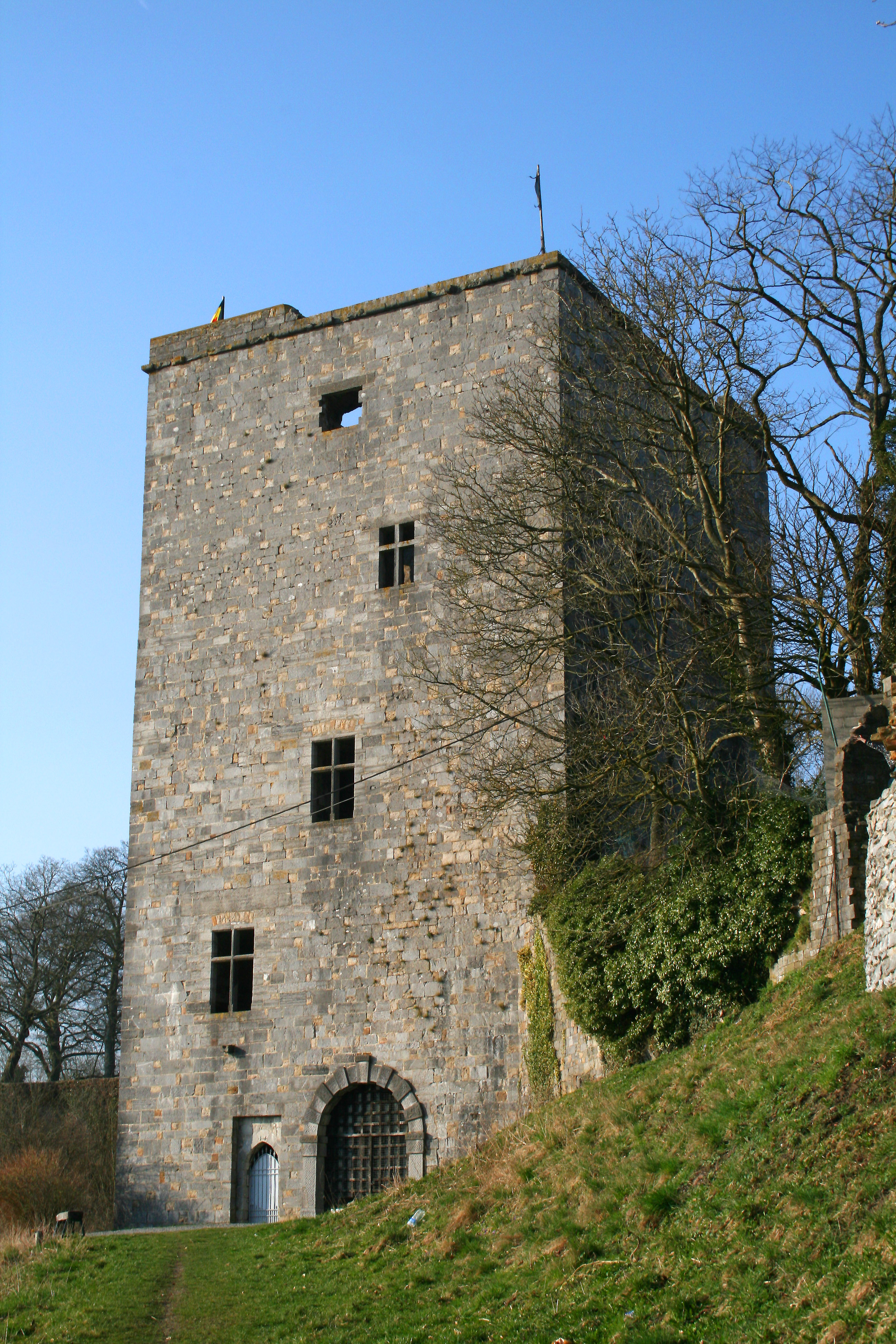
The ruined Salamander tower

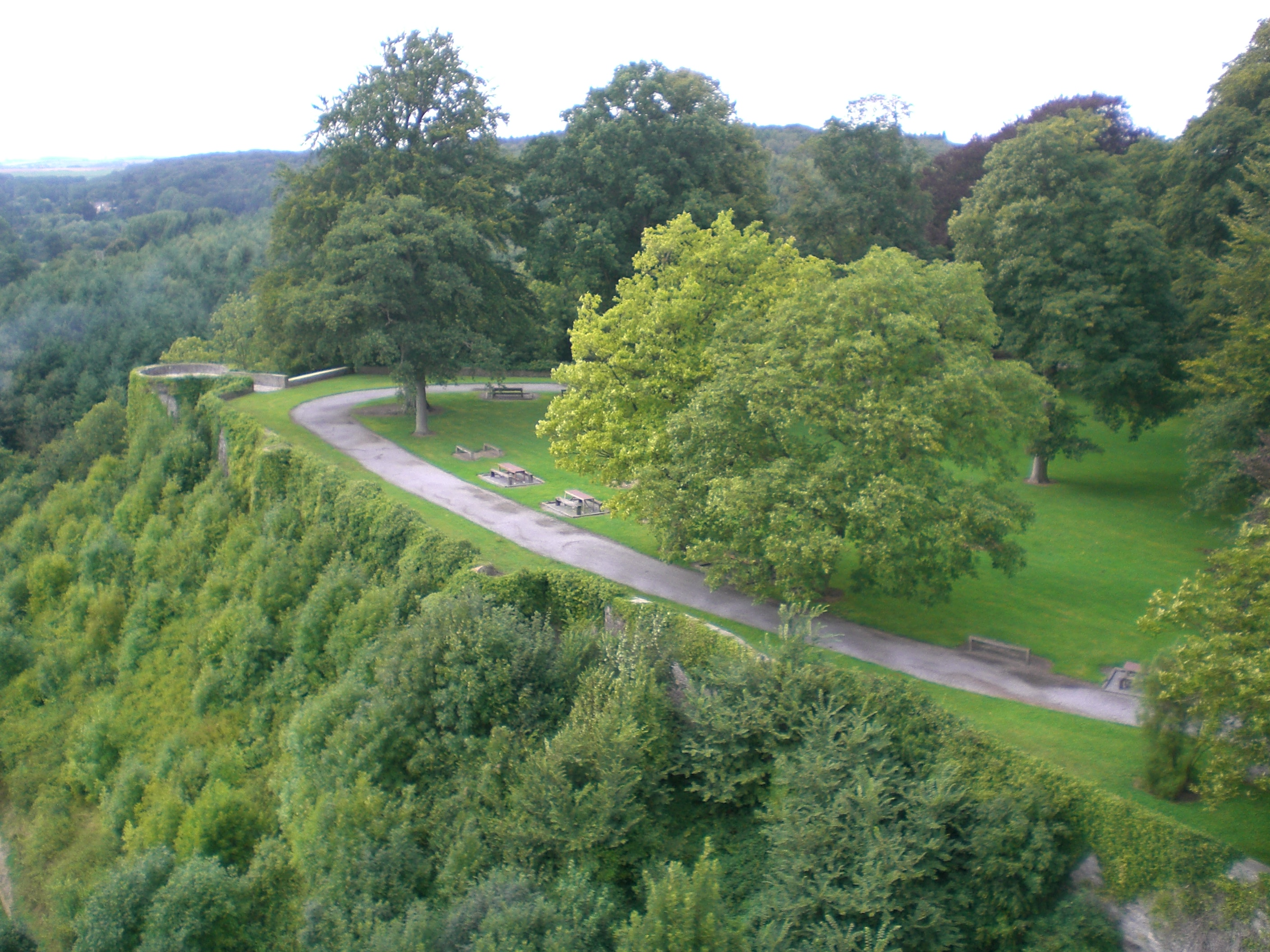
The castle's location is now a park, although some ramparts remain

=== Counts of Hainaut ===
Around 1070, Richilde, Countess of Hainaut (1020-1086) constructed a castle at Beaumont with a chapel dedicated to Saint Venantius. Its aim was to defend the southern part of the County of Hainaut. It stood on the edge of a small plateau on the right bank of the Hantes river, overlooking the valley. The castle consisted only of one keep, the so-called Salamander tower.

Under Baldwin IV (1108-1171) and Baldwin V (1150-1195), the tower and the castle were enlarged into a fortress, which was able to defend the new town developing on the plateau. Around 1340, at the start of Hundred Years' War, the castle and the keep burned down, but were restored soon afterwards.

Throughout the 15th century, thanks to its fortress and its solid walls, Beaumont escaped the devastation which accompanied the conflicts ravaging the region.

=== House of Croÿ ===
In 1453, Philip the Good, Duke of Burgundy (1396-1467), granted the land of Beaumont to Antoine I de Croÿ, known as ‘the Great’ (French: Le Grand de Croÿ) (1383/1387-1475). Antoine played a key role in the Burgundian court and 15th century French politics. For example, he occupied the post of Governor General of the Netherlands and Luxembourg. Under the Croÿ family, the castle turned from a fortress into a palace. The château of Beaumont became their main seat and residence. At the same time, the village transformed as well into an important city.

Antoine was succeeded by his son Philip I de Croÿ (1435-1511), who was raised together with Charles the Bold (1433-1477). He was an advisor to the Dukes of Burgundy and was also governor of Luxembourg and Ligny. When Philip I died, he again was succeeded by his son, William de Croÿ (1458-1521). William was the chief tutor and first chamberlain to Charles V (1500-1558), Holy Roman Emperor and King of Spain. William was married to Marie de Hamal, but their marriage was childless. Therefore, he was succeeded by his nephew, Philip II de Croÿ (1496-1549), the first Duke of Aarschot, who was then succeeded by his sons Charles II de Croÿ (1522-1551) and Philippe III de Croÿ (1526-1595), Stadtholder of Flanders.

==== Charles III de Croÿ ====
The last and most famous Croÿ prince living at the Château of Beaumont was Charles III de Croÿ (1560-1612). He was born at the castle and also died here. Charles III played an important role of both sides of the Dutch Revolt. Initially, he was Stadtholder of Flanders on behalf of the insurgents. But he decided to reconcile with the King of Spain and changed sides. He fought alongside Alexander Farnese, Duke of Parma, and achieved various military victories.

Charles III made the palace-fortress of Beaumont his favourite residence, next to his castle in Heverlee. The castle was restored, and beautiful gardens were created. Charles III was an avid collector of art: paintings, manuscripts, coins and metals. These collections were brought together at the château of Beaumont, where it filled the halls and galleries of the castle.

Charles III is famous for the creation of his ‘Albums de Croÿ’, a collection of 2,500 detailed illustrated maps of all his domains and possessions. These Albums were housed in his library in the Salamander Tower. The Albums offer us today an important topographical insight into the cities and villages of the Southern Netherlands.

Although, Charles III was married twice, both his marriages remained childless. After his death in 1612, all his titles and possessions went to his sister Anne de Croÿ (1563-1635), who was married to Charles de Ligne, 2nd Prince of Arenberg (1550-1612). Their granddaughter, Anne-Caroline of Arenberg, princess de Chimay married Eugène de Hénin, count of Boussu. And from here, the ownership of Beaumont went into the Hénin-Liétard and Riquet de Caraman families. Both families also owned Chimay Castle and the title of ‘prince de Chimay’, which once also belonged to Charles III. The Caraman family sell their remaining possessions in Beaumont to a monastic order.

=== 17th century ===
The 17th century was a century of misfortune. In 1632, the war was followed by the plague, which decimated Beaumont's population. In 1637, the city was besieged for the first time. The walls were weakened: the fire and cannonballs of modern artillery caused serious breaches.

In 1655, French Troops under Turenne invaded the Netherlands. The city of Beaumont refused to cooperate, and in retaliation, the French troops set the city on fire. Barely thirty houses were spared. Also, the castle, the church, and the Salamander Tower were in ruins. Of three kilometres of ramparts, only a third remains. Out of four gates, only one postern remains.

The castle was not restored. The princes de Chimay acquired a hotel at the market place in Beaumont, where they staid when visiting the city. In June 1815, before the Battle of Waterloo, Napoleon staid here.

=== Today ===
Nothing remains of the castle, except for the ruins of the Salamander Tower. The keep houses a museum, which tells about the history of Beaumont and its fortifications. Its collections include reproductions of the famous maps of the Album de Croÿ. The location of the castle is now a park.

== Literature ==
- Bernier, Théodore (1880). Histoire de la ville de Beaumont. p. 255.
- Châteaux chevaliers en Hainaut au Moyen Age. Valenciennes: Credit Communal/ Musée des Beaux-Arts de Valenciennes. 1995. ISBN 2-87193-212-3.
- Paye, Anne; Rickert, Hélène (2007). Guide des Remparts de Beaumont réalisé par les élèves et leurs professeurs Anne Paye et Marie-Hélène Rickert à l’occasion des Journées du Patrimoine 2007 organisées au sein de l’établissement (PDF) (in French). p. 29.
- De Waha, Michel (2011). Carnets du Patrimoine n° 78. Beaumont, fer de lance du Hainaut dans l'Entre-Sambre-et-Meuse (in French). Namur: Institut Du Patrimoine Wallon. p. 64. ISBN 9782875220547.
- De Jonge, Krista; Maekelberg, Sanne (2018). Noble living. The castle at Heverlee, from Croÿ to Arenberg. Leuven: KU Leuven Bibliotheken. p. 62. ISBN 9789080694774.
- De Jonge, Krista; Maekelberg, Sanne (2018). "Castles and gardens. The Croÿ legacy". In Derez, Mark; Vanhauwaert, Soetkin; Verbrugge, Anne (eds.). Arenberg. Portrait of a Family, Story of a Collection. Turnhout: Brepols. pp. 184–191. ISBN 2503581153.
- Maekelberg, Sanne (2021). "Matérialiser Sa Noblesse Sur La Frontière Des Anciens Pays-Bas Avec La France. Le Patrimoine Architectural de Charles de Croÿ, Prince de Chimay et Duc d'Aarschot (1560-1612)". In Soen, Violet; Junot, Yves (eds.). Noblesses transrégionales: Les Croÿ et les frontières pendant les guerres de religion en France, Lorraine et aux Pays-Bas (in French). Turnhout: Brepols. pp. 199–233. ISBN 978-2503582993.
- Maekelberg, Sanne (2023). ""Au couvert, sans estre vues": Aspects of Privacy in the Residences of Charles de Croÿ (1560-1612)". In Green, Michaël; Huysman, Ineke (eds.). Private Life and Privacy in the Early Modern Low Countries. Turnhout: Brepols. pp. 122–144. ISBN 978-2503604442.
- Briquet-Fagot, Béatrice. Château de Beaumont et Tour Salamandre (livret) (in French). Beaumont: Office du Tourisme de Beaumon.
