= João Ferreira-Rosa =

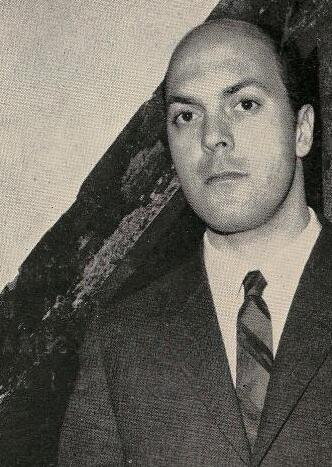
- João Ferreira-Rosa in a postcard from the 1960s

Background information
- Born: João Manuel Soares Ferreira-Rosa; February 16, 1937; Lisbon, Portugal
- Died: September 24, 2017 (aged 80) Loures, Portugal
- Genres: Fado
- Occupations: singer; lyricist

João Manuel Soares Ferreira-Rosa (16 February 1937 – 24 September 2017) was a Portuguese Fado singer and lyricist. Although he considered himself an amateur, saying "I only sing when I feel like it", he is considered a "central figure in the universe of traditional Fado". The most emblematic song in his repertoire is Fado do Embuçado, a poem by Gabriel de Oliveira sung to the music of Fado Tradição, a traditional fado by Alcídia Rodrigues.

== Early life and education ==
João Ferreira-Rosa was born in Lisbon. As a young boy, during the summer holidays in Castelo de Vide, he became interested in Cante Alentejano, and started singing among friends and family. Shortly after, he became interested in Fado, admiring Amália Rodrigues and Alfredo Marceneiro in particular. He started singing in public after he enrolled in the Escola Agrícola de Santarém. This school was known for the violent hazing of the freshmen, but when the veteran students learnt he could sing Fado, they decided on not hazing him, as long as he sang for them whenever asked. It was also at this time that he started writing lyrics for himself and others.

== Career ==
Due to his insistence on not becoming a professional singer, Ferreira-Rosa had an uncommon career — although he also disliked the word "career" for the same reason. He replaced Maria Teresa de Noronha as a Fado singer at the Emissora Nacional and recorded his first EPs in the 1960s; however, when Valentim de Carvalho asked him to record an LP, he refused and cancelled his recording contract, believing this format was too long for Fado.

In 1966, Ferreira-Rosa opened the Taverna do Embuçado, a Fado House in an historic building in Alfama, which quickly became one of the most well-known in Lisbon.

Also in the 1960s, Ferreira-Rosa acquired the Palácio Pintéus (Pintéus Palace), in Loures, where he would promote Fado events (including TV shows that aired on RTP), concerts, and salons. It was also there that he recorded his album Ontem e Hoje (released in 1996).

== Political views ==
João Ferreira-Rosa was a staunch monarchist. He was initially associated with the People's Monarchist Party, but moved away after the departure of its founders, Gonçalo Ribeiro Telles and Henrique Barrilaro Ruas. About this distancing, he would say: "Monarchy should be a movement, an idea, and never a political party. Because taking part in the Assembly of the Republic is already a mistake, I think." Despite this political view, he supported Demétrio Alves, the Communist Party's candidate for mayor of Loures, because he considered him a good mayor.

== Death ==
João Ferreira-Rosa died in Loures Hospital on 24 September 2017.

== Discography ==
- Embuçado (1964)
- Ontem e Hoje (1996)
- No Wonder Bar do Casino do Estoril (2004)
