= Riquet =

Given name

Riquet is a given name. Notable people with the name include:

- Dominique Riquet (born 1946), French surgeon and politician of the Radical Party and MEP
- François-Joseph-Philippe de Riquet (1771–1843), comte de Caraman was the 16th Prince de Chimay
- Pedro Riquet (1598–1640), Spanish composer
- Pierre-Paul Riquet (1609–1680), engineer and canal-builder responsible for the construction of the Canal du Midi
- Joseph de Riquet de Caraman (1808–1886), 17th Prince de Chimay, Belgian diplomat and industrialist
- Joseph de Riquet de Caraman-Chimay (1836–1892), Belgian diplomat and politician
- Valentine de Riquet de Caraman-Chimay (1839–1914), Belgian princess
- Marie-Clotilde-Elisabeth Louise de Riquet, comtesse de Mercy-Argenteau (1837–1890), Belgian pianist

== See also ==
- Riquet (Paris Métro), a station of the Paris Métro
- Riquet Obelisk dedicated to the creator of the Canal du Midi, Pierre-Paul Riquet
- Bonrepos-Riquet, a commune in the Haute-Garonne department in southwestern France
- Riquet with the Tuft, a French literary fairy tale first published by Catherine Bernard in 1696
- Riqueti
