= Jacob van Deventer =

Jacob van Deventer may refer to:

- Jacob van Deventer (cartographer) (c. 1500–1575), Dutch Renaissance cartographer
- Jacob van Deventer (general) (1874–1922), South African general
