= August Nörmiger =

German composer and organist

August Nörmiger (ca. 1560–1613) was a German composer and court organist in Dresden. He was born and died in Dresden.

The main source for Nörmiger's compositions is the manuscript Organ tabulature "Tabulaturbuch auff dem Instrumente", which he compiled for Sophie von Sachsen in 1598. He gives few indications as to his sources.

== Recordings ==
- Mattasin oder Toden Tanz 1598 (an example of Danse macabre) on Ars Moriendi Huelgas Ensemble, dir. Paul Van Nevel.
- 4 dances Tantz Von Gott Will Ich Nicht Lassen etc. on Sacred music of the Renaissance; Monte, Lassus, White. by Huelgas Ensemble, dir. Paul Van Nevel (LP CD)"Seon" 60705. 1978
- Churf. Sachs. Witwen Erster Mummerey Tanz (1598) and Der Mohren Auftzugkh (1598). Organ tuned to quarter-comma meantone (pure thirds) temperament, played by Andrew Pink.
