= Fado Museum =

Museum dedicated to Fado music

- Museu do Fado

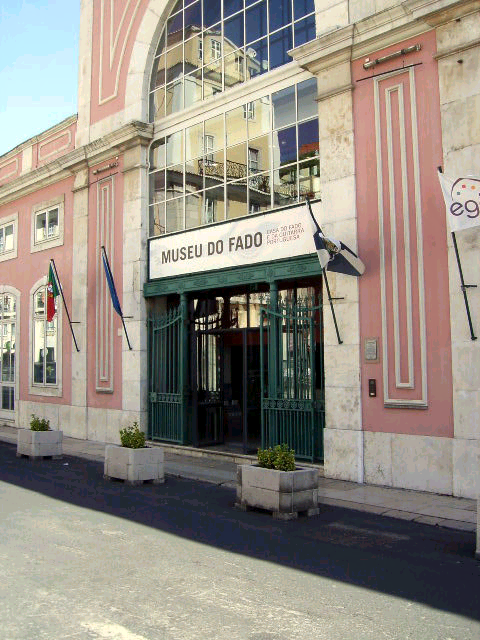
- The Fado Museum entrance in Lisbon
- Interactive fullscreen map
- Established: 25 September 1998; 27 years ago
- Location: Largo do Chafariz de Dentro, 1, Lisbon, Portugal
- Coordinates: 38.7111284°N 9.127618°W
- Type: Music museum
- Visitors: 53,014 (2022)
- Director: Sara Pereira
- Public transit access: Metro: Santa Apolónia; Train: Santa Apolónia; Bus: Lines 728, 735, 759, 794
- Website: www.museudofado.pt

The Fado Museum is a music museum dedicated to Fado located in the Lisbon neighbourhood of Alfama. It was inaugurated on 25 September 1998.

== The building ==
The museum is housed in a building that was formerly a pumping station for Lisbon's water supply. Construction began in 1868 and in 1869 two steam engines made by an Anglo-French company, E. Windsor & Fils, were installed to power the pumping mechanism. It continued to carry out this function until 1938. The building then functioned as a workshop until after the 1974 Carnation Revolution, when it was occupied by the Portuguese Communist Party. Before opening as the Fado museum in 1998 it was restored and enlarged.

== The museum ==
In 2008 the museum was thoroughly renovated. Rather than recreating the traditional environment of Fado, its Permanent Exhibition changed its focus to exhibiting artworks related to Fado by artists such as José Malhoa, Júlio Pomar and Constatino Fernandes, as well as objects from Fado's history, including sheet music, videos, music and hundreds of biographies. Among the works exhibited are the paintings O fado by José Malhoa and Os fadistas (1873) by Rafael Bordalo Pinheiro. An audio guide in Portuguese, English, French and Spanish was also made available to the museum's visitors.

Since 2016 the museum hosts on its official website a digital sound archive with thousands of sound recordings, available in full, going back to the beginning of the 20th century. The recordings can be browsed by interpreter or repertoire. It has also launched a record label, Museu do Fado Discos.
