= Francisco Viana =

Portuguese fado guitarist and composer

Francisco Viana (1895 – 1945 in Lisbon) was a Portuguese guitarist and composer of fados. He is the originator of the Fado Vianinha style, named after him in distinction from, for example the Fado Marceneiro style of Alfredo Marceneiro.
