= Gheerkin de Hondt =

Dutch composer of polyphonic songs

Gheerkin de Hondt (also Gheerken, Gheraert, Gerit, Gerrit, Gheerart, Gerryt de Hont) (1490 – 1547) was a Dutch singer, choirmaster, and composer of polyphonic songs.

Despite the enormous popularity of his songs, very little biographical information survives. He was probably born c. 1495, the son of a Jacob de Hondt; if this was the Jacob who was guardian of the choirboys in Bruges in the 1530s, this may imply he was a native of Bruges. He was appointed choirmaster in Delft's Nieuwe Kerk in mid-1521 but left at the end of 1523; he was re-appointed to the post in 1530. He left Delft 18 months later to take up the equivalent position at the church of Sint-Jacob in Bruges, where he remained until 1539. In December 1539 he became choirmaster of the Marian brotherhood in 's-Hertogenbosch, where he remained until he left in 1547, apparently dismissed for failing to take adequate care of the choirboys. It appears he went to Friesland, but he disappears from the historical record at this point - although Diehl asserts that there is a record of his death in the Bruges archives in 1562.

Of his compositions 5 mass settings, 4 motets and 9 songs survive, most of them preserved in the songbook of Zeghere van Male (Cambrai MS 125–128), 1542. At least one other mass is known to have been lost. A single song was printed by Pierre Phalèse in 1553 & 1556.

== Recordings ==
- Complete motets, most of the songs and one mass. Gheerkin de Hondt A portrait Egidius Kwartet, Etcetera. 2004
- Het was mij wel te vooren gheseijt. Two versions on Musica aldersoetste Konst Huelgas Ensemble, dir. Paul Van Nevel. Belgian radio 1985; released Klara 2000.

== References and further reading ==
- Véronique Roelvink, Gheerkin de Hondt. A singer-composer in the sixteenth-century Low Countries. Ph.D. Leiden University (Utrecht 2015, ISBN 9789082376807)
- George Diehl, The Partbooks of a Renaissance Merchant: Cambrai, Bibliotheque Municipale, MSS 125-128. Ph.D. University of Pennsylvania, 1974
