= Johannes Heer =

Johannes Heer of Glarus (1489–1553) was a song composer and copyist, and later minister in the Reformed Church from Glarus, east-central Switzerland. His Liederbuch, or chansonnier, was copied during his study in Paris. Apart from works by Brumel, Josquin, and Senfl, the songbook includes anonymous pieces and works by Heer himself. An edition, Das Liederbuch des Johannes Heer von Glarus, was published as part of the series Schweizerische Musikdenkmaler Basel, 1967. Recordings of selections were made by the Huelgas Ensemble (1977) and the Ludwig Senfl Ensemble (1991).
