= El Grillo (song) =

Frottola by Josquin des Prez

- Frottola
- English: The Cricket
- Written: c. 1490s
- Language: Italian
- Published: 1505
- Scoring: Four voices

El Grillo (The Cricket) is a frottola attributed to Josquin des Prez.

El grillo
Sung by the dwsChorale

== History ==
The sole surviving sources of El Grillo are the Frottole libro tertio published by Ottaviano Petrucci in 1505 and its 1507 reprint. The piece received considerably little attention from modern musicologists until 1931, when it was included in Geschichte der Musik in Beispielen by Arnold Schering.

== Lyrics and analysis ==
The following text is from the original Petrucci edition.

Renaissance Italian (original)	Modern Italian translation	English translation
El grillo è buon cantore Che tiene longo verso Dalle beve, grillo canta Ma non fa come gli altri uccelli Come li han cantato un poco Van de fatto in altro loco Sempre el grillo sta pur saldo Quando la maggior el caldo Alhor canta sol per amore	Il grillo è un bravo cantante Che tiene un lungo verso Beve e poi canta, il grillo Ma non fa come gli altri uccelli Che dopo aver cantato un po' Vanno via in un altro posto Il grillo invece rimane fermo Quando fa più caldo Allora canta solo per amore	The cricket is a good singer Who can hold long notes After drinking, the cricket sings But he doesn't do like the other birds Once they've sung a little bit They go somewhere else The cricket instead stands firm When it's very hot out He sings only for the love of it

The song is scored for four voices. Written from a third-person perspective, El Grillo concerns the cricket. The opening section is about the cricket's lengthy song, while the second one compares crickets and songbirds. The song concludes by suggesting that crickets may be better singers than songbirds, particularly because they sing all the time. At the hottest part of the day, when even the birds are silent, only the cricket continues to sing, for love. And this makes him the better singer, for in matters of love, perseverance is worth more than fancy talking.

The song contains both homophony and onomatopoeia, with its rhythm mimicking a cricket's mannerisms. Notice that in popular Italian, the word "grillo" has a second meaning: the male sexual organ in erection. Since the cigala's—those big crickets that live in trees—seem to be referred to (see below for further details), it will be easy to also imagine the more "piquant" meaning of the song.

Uncharacteristically for a frottola, the ripresa of the poetic lines mostly have seven syllables, whereas the piedi and volta have eight.

The lyrics notably refer to the cricket as a "bird," while it is actually an insect. This can be explained by different factors, including the poetic liberty of the artist, emphasizing the melodious and captivating nature of the cricket, or limitations of the time, such as a lack of scientific knowledge or a colloquial understanding in which the word "bird" was used more broadly to describe creatures that sang or produced musical sounds, such as crickets. According to Hund, a different explanation is possible: the poet probably had in mind the big, noisy bugs called cigalas (cicadas), which may be mistaken for crickets, and which live in the Mediterranean regions. Like birds, they house in trees, but contrary to them, don't move an inch all day (sta pur saldo). They 'sing' on and on to allure a female to mate. The joyous ternary rhythm of this section symbolises the contrast between the cricket's monotonous scraping and the melodious birdsong.

== Legacy ==
Willem Elders calls El Grillo "one of the most brilliant songs of the late fifteenth century", while Richard Sherr describes it as a "delightful jokey little piece." Henry Vyverberg writes that it "represents the frottola at its most attractive.".
