= Dhondt =

Dhondt is a Dutch surname, most common in East Flanders. It is a compression of the surnames D'Hondt and De Hondt. A variant spelling is Dhont. Notable people with the surname include:

Dhondt

- Aaron Dhondt (born 1995), Belgian footballer
- Astère M. Dhondt (born 1937), Belgian writer
- Philippe Dhondt (born 1965), French singer, songwriter, composer and radio host
- Sean Dhondt (born 1984), Belgian musician

Dhont

- Erik Dhont (born 1962), Belgian landscape architect

== See also ==
- Hondius
- De Hondt
- D'Hondt
