= Frottola =

Italian song of the late 15th and early 16th century

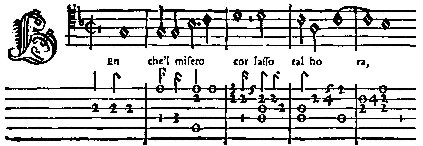

The frottola (pronounced [ˈfrɔttola]; plural frottole) was the predominant type of Italian popular secular song of the late fifteenth and early sixteenth century. It was the most important and widespread predecessor to the madrigal. The peak of activity in composition of frottole was the period from 1470 to 1530, after which time the form was replaced by the madrigal.

While "frottola" is a generic term, several subcategories can be recognized, as would be expected of a musical form which was used for approximately a hundred years, maintaining immense popularity for more than half of that time. Most typically, a frottola is a composition for three or four voices (more towards the end of the period), with the uppermost voice containing the melody: instrumental accompaniments may have been used. The poem usually has a rhyme scheme of ABBA for a ripresa (reprise), and a stanza of CDCDDA or CDCDDEEA, though there is much variation between subtypes of frottola. Most likely the poetic forms are descended from the fourteenth-century ballata, though the music shows a startling simplification from late fourteenth-century practice.

Musically, the frottola avoids contrapuntal complexity, preferring homophonic textures, clear and repetitive rhythms, and a narrow melodic range. It was an important predecessor not only to the madrigal, but to much later practices in the Baroque era such as monody, since it anticipates chordal accompaniment, has the melody in the highest voice, and shows an early feeling for what later developed into functional harmony.

Very little is known about performance practice. Contemporary editions are sometimes for multiple voices, with or without lute tablature; occasionally keyboard scores survive. Frottole may have been performed as solo voice with lute accompaniment—certainly Marchetto Cara may have performed them this way at the Gonzaga court, as is implied by his renown as lutenist, singer, and composer of frottole—and they also may have been performed by other combinations of singers and instruments as well.

The most famous composers of frottola were Bartolomeo Tromboncino and Marchetto Cara, although some of the popular secular compositions of Josquin (for example Scaramella and "El Grillo") are stylistically frottole, though not in name.

The frottola was a significant influence not only on the madrigal, but on the French chanson, which also tended to be a light, danceable, and popular form. Many French composers of the period went to Italy, either to work in aristocratic courts or at the papal chapel in Rome. While in Italy, they encountered the frottola, and incorporated some of what they heard in their native secular compositions.

== Composers ==
Composers of frottole include:

- Francesco d'Ana
- Giovanni Brocco
- Antonio Caprioni
- Marchetto Cara
- Giacomo Fogliano
- Lodovico Fogliano
- Erasmus Lapicida
- Filippo de Lurano
- Rossino Mantovano
- Michele Pesenti
- Bartolomeo Tromboncino
- Michele Vicentino

Except for Tromboncino and Cara, who were extremely famous, very little is known about most of these composers; in many cases only their names survive, and those because Petrucci, the prominent Venetian publisher, included their names in collections containing their music.
