= Las Huelgas Codex =

Spanish music manuscript from c. 1300

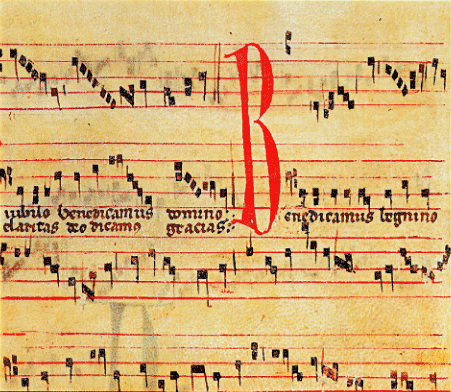
A page from the manuscript: note red staff and capital

The Codex Las Huelgas is a music manuscript or codex from c. 1300 which originated in and has remained in the Cistercian convent of Santa María la Real de Las Huelgas in Burgos, in northern Spain. The convent was a wealthy one which had connections with the royal family of Castile.

The manuscript contains 45 monophonic pieces (20 sequences, 5 conductus, 10 Benedicamus tropes) and 141 polyphonic compositions. Most of the music dates from the late 13th century, with some music from the first half of the 13th century (Notre Dame repertory), and a few later additions from the first quarter of the 14th century. Many of the pieces are not found in any other manuscripts.

It is written on parchment, with the staves written in red ink with Franconian notation. The bulk of material is written in one hand, although as many as 12 people contributed to it, including corrections and later additions. Johannes Roderici (Juan Rodríguez in modern Spanish) inscribed his name in a number of places in the manuscript. He may have composed a couple of the pieces in the manuscript, as well as being scribe, compiler, and corrector, according to his own inscriptions.

The music was intended for use in performance, presumably within the monastery which had a choir of 100 women at one point in the 13th century. The manuscript raises questions regarding performance practice of the pieces it contains, especially the polyphonic repertory. It is believed that this choir of women performed the polyphonic works in the manuscript, despite Cistercian rules against the performance of polyphonic music. Two-part polyphony appears to have been considered legitimate. In 1217, the General Chapter complained about two English abbeys which were said to sing in three or four parts in the manner of non-monastic churches; the implication is that two-part polyphony was then acceptable, and the manuscript contains two-part solfège exercises with notations on their use in the convent. However, there are also three-part pieces.

== Publication history ==
The manuscript was rediscovered in 1904 by two Benedictine monks who were researching Gregorian chant. However, the music was not published until the 1930s. There is also a 1980s edition.

== Huelgas Ensemble ==
The Huelgas Ensemble, a Belgian group specialising in polyphony, takes its name from the codex. It was founded in 1971.

== Recordings ==
There have been many recordings of music from the Codex. Notable recordings include those of:

- Sequentia (Ensemble Sequentia, Köln). Codex Las Huelgas: Music from the Royal Convent of Las Huelgas de Burgos, 13-14th C. on Deutsche Harmonia Mundi, 1992. Directed by Benjamin Bagby & Barbara Thornton.
- The Huelgas Ensemble, which was founded by Paul Van Nevel, has performed many important early Spanish and Portuguese works including much music from the Codex.
- Anonymous 4, founded in 1986. This women's a cappella group, released the album: "Secret Voices: Chant and Polyphony from the Las Huelgas Codex" in 2011.
- Ars Combinatoria, founded in 1991 by Canco López. The concept behind the creation of the group was to be able to perform any type of music from any period, changing the composition of the ensemble accordingly. Ars Combinatoria released the album: "Mulier Misterio. El Códice de las Huelgas. Musaris" in 2017.

== Bibliography ==
- Higinio Anglès El Còdex Musical de Las Huelgas. Música a veus dels segles XIII-XIV, 3 vols., Institut d’Estudis Catalans, Barcelona, 1931; facsimile edition with commentary.
- Gordon Athol Anderson The Las Huelgas Manuscript, Burgos, Monasterio de Las Huelgas, 2 vols., Corpus Mensurabilis Musicæ 79, American Institute of Musicology, Hänssler Verlag, Neuhausen-Stuttgart, 1982; transcription into modern notation.
