= Joaquim Pimentel =

Portuguese fado singer

Joaquim Tavares Pimentel (15 JUL 1910 Cedofeita Porto, Portugal] – 15 July 2003 in Lisbon) was a Portuguese Fado singer, who made his career as "ambassador" of the fado in Brazil, where he became popular and was called "the prince of Portuguese song."

He first visited Brazil from 1934 to 1935, returned again to spend the war years in Brazil, and settled there permanently in 1947. Among his fados are Dá tempo ao tempo, and Voltaste recorded by Beatriz da Conceiçao, José Antonio (viola), José Manuel (guitar) for Paul Van Nevel in 1996.
