= Andrés Barea =

Spanish composer

Andrés Barea (ca.1610–1680) was a Spanish composer. He was maestro de capilla at the cathedrals of Osma, Salamanca, Valladolid, and finally Palencia in 1654.
