= Riqueti =

Riqueti is a surname. Notable people with the surname include:

- André Boniface Louis de Riquetti, vicomte de Mirabeau (1754–1792), one of the reactionary leaders at the opening of the French Revolution
- Honoré Gabriel Riqueti, comte de Mirabeau (1749–1791), French writer, popular orator and statesman
- Joseph Shalit Riqueti, Jewish-Italian scholar born at Safed, who directed a Talmudical school in Verona
- Sibylle Gabrielle Marie Antoinette Riqueti de Mirabeau (1849–1932), French writer who wrote under the pseudonym GYP
- Victor de Riqueti, marquis de Mirabeau (1715–1789), French economist of the Physiocratic school
