= Johannes Sticheler =

Johannes Sticheler or Johannes Stickels is a 15th-century composer known primarily from his Missa se j'avoye porpoin de valeur in Vienna, Nationalbibliothek, MS 1 1883. He is possibly the same composer as Jonnes Estiche, known for an Ave Maris Stella and a motet or mass section Et incarnatus est.
