= Meijer de Hond =

Dutch rabbi (1882–1943)

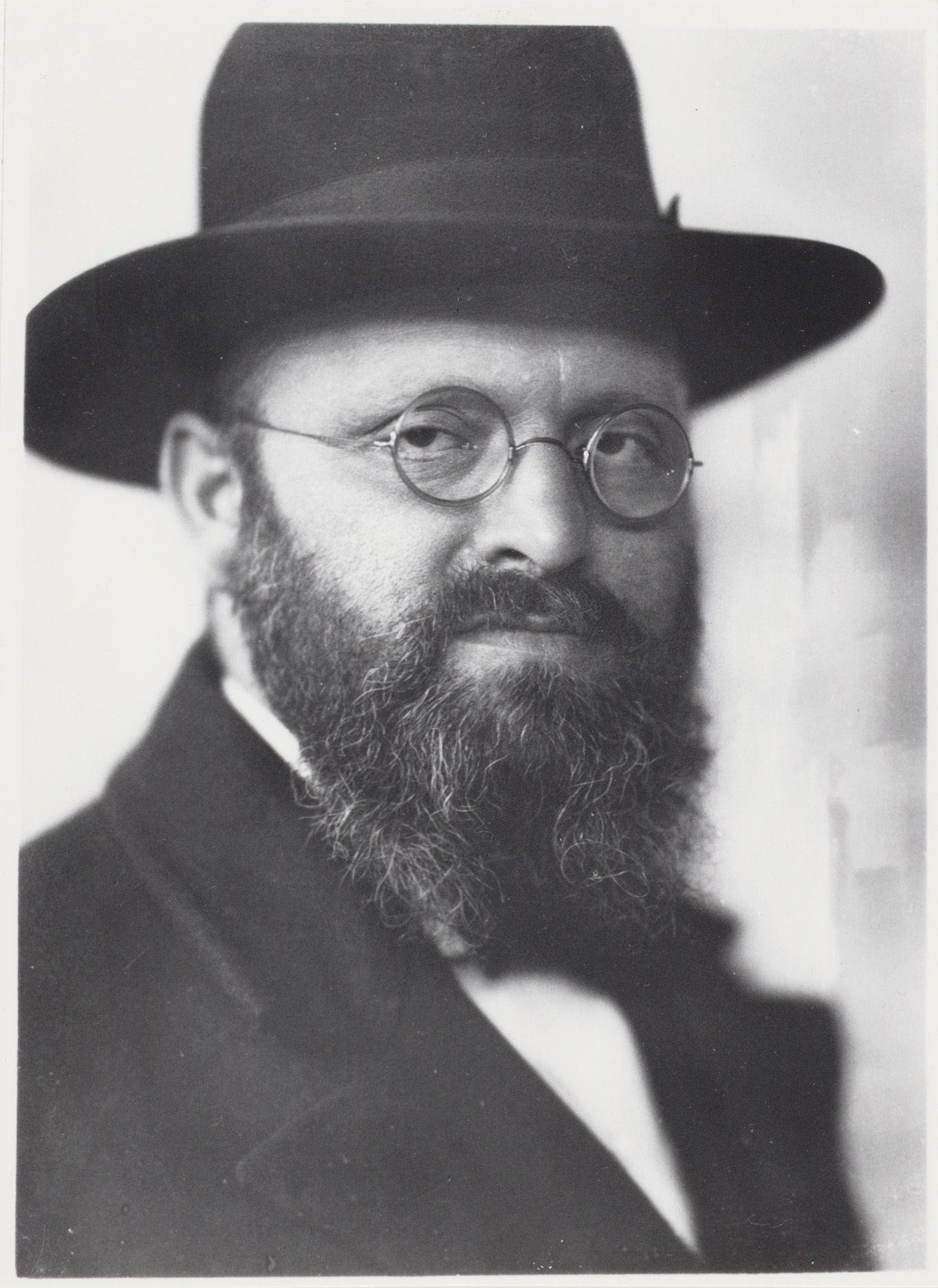
- Meijer de Hond in 1928

Personal life
- Born: 30 August 1882 Amsterdam, Netherlands
- Died: 23 July 1943 (aged 60) Sobibor extermination camp, General Governorate for the Occupied Polish Region
- Spouse: Betje Kattenburg (m. 1920)
- Education: University of Amsterdam; Julius Maximilian University of Würzburg
- Occupation: Rabbi

Religious life
- Religion: Judaism

Jewish leader
- Organisation: Touroh Our; De Joodse Invalide
- Yahrtzeit: 20 Tammuz

Meijer de Hond (30 August 1882 – 23 July 1943), was a Dutch rabbi. He authored the Hebrew magazine Libanon, where he depicted the lives of the Jewish poor of Amsterdam, promoted traditional Jewish values, opposed socialism and Zionism, but also suggested the relaxation of some traditional rules and customs. Despite his popularity among the poor, who gave him the nickname Volksrebbe, his reformist religious views led to conflicts with Jewish authorities which resulted in the disruption of his education. After further studies in Germany, he returned to Amsterdam but struggled to gain recognition within the Jewish establishment. He actively contributed to cultural and social initiatives, including founding youth organisations and a theatre association. In 1943, he and his family were deported to Westerbork and later murdered in Auschwitz and Sobibor.

== Biography ==
Meijer de Hond was born in Amsterdam in one of the poorest Jewish quarters as the son of Mozes Levie de Hond and Esther van Praag. After finishing school, he attended the Nederlandsch-Israëlietisch Seminarium from 1894, with whose director, Chief Rabbi Joseph Hirsch Dünner, he had a strained relationship. In 1901, he began studying at the University of Amsterdam, which was compulsory to obtain the highest rabbinical examination, and attended lectures in classical philology, philosophy, and archaeology. On 26 October 1904, he passed his examination at the university and received the degree of rabbinical candidate (magid) at the seminarium.

Even during his student years, de Hond acquired a reputation as an outstanding preacher and speaker. In order to give him the opportunity to speak to large audiences more often, the association Touroh Our (The Teaching is the Light) was founded in 1905. Between 1908 and 1914, the association published the Hebrew-language monthly magazine Libanon, of which de Hond himself was the sole author. The magazine published the first Kiekjes, short stories about daily life in the Jewish quarter, some of which were later collected and published in book form. He described above all the life of the "orderly, quiet poor", whom he regarded as bearers of Jewish piety and tradition, which, in the opinion of contemporaries, glorified and romanticised poverty. He did not believe in social reforms and rejected socialism and Zionism. However, he was popular among the poor Jewish Amsterdammers and was given the nickname Volksrebbe ('people's rabbi').

In 1908, Meijer de Hond wrote articles which condemned rich Jews who were, in his opinion, circumventing Jewish dietary rules by lavishing their meals outside of fasting periods. On the other hand, he called for many rules that had arisen through tradition and were not written in the Torah to be relaxed, as they represented a great burden for believers in everyday life. In another article, he advocated free prayer instead of prayer formulas, as faith was more a matter of the heart than of the mind. For these views, he was strongly attacked by Philip Elte, the editor-in-chief of the Nieuw Israëlietisch Weekblad, who refused to publish de Hond's replies.

In August 1908, de Hond was asked by the Amsterdam Rabbinical Assembly to clearly distance himself from his views and to profess traditional Judaism and the rules of worship. De Hond obeyed, but he broke off his education (or was denied the continuation). With the financial support of Touroh Our, he was able to study in Berlin from 1909 to 1911 and take his Morenu exam there. One of his teachers was Hirsch Hildesheimer. Until 1912 he continued his studies of Semitic languages at various German universities and in 1912 he received his doctorate from the Julius Maximilian University in Würzburg on the subject of "Contributions to the explanation of the Elhiḍr legend and of Ḳorân, Sura 18 59 ff. (The ḳorānisirte Elhiḍr)". In 1920, he married Betje Kattenburg; the couple had three children, two girls and a boy.

During his studies, de Hond remained in contact with the Jewish community in Amsterdam. In 1911, he published the brochure Een Joodsch hart klopt aan Uw deur!, in which he called for the construction of a home for Jewish invalids, who until then had been housed in the poorhouse in a separate room for Jews, the Jodenzaaltje. As a result, the association De Joodse Invalide was founded, which had already raised enough money by 1912 to be able to open its own home for the disabled people.

After his return from Germany, de Hond remained persona non grata in the leading circles of Dutch Jewry and had no prospect of a suitable position. His rabbi title was not recognised because the exam had not been taken in the Netherlands; the title was only awarded to him honoris causa in 1942 by Chief Rabbi Lodewijk Hartog Sarlouis, Dünner's successor, on the occasion of his 60th birthday. De Hond remained Touroh Our's spiritual leader, and over the years his reputation as a speaker grew; among other things, he preached in the small synagogue (sjoeltje) Reisjies Touw. In 1928 he was the first Dutch rabbi to speak on the radio.

Meijer de Hond was not only active as a speaker and publicist, he was also committed to the cultural and social advancement of the Jewish proletariat of Amsterdam. He gave religious instruction, founded a theatre association and, in 1913, the youth association Jong-Betsalel. He wrote plays for the theatre association and songs for the children's choir De Joodse Stem. The association opened several schools and de Hond trained the religious teachers. From 1928 to 1935, the association published the youth magazine Betsalel (Joodsche Jeugd Krant) with educational but also entertaining content, of which de Hond was the editor-in-chief and most important author.

After the occupation of the Netherlands by the German Wehrmacht in May 1940, Meijer de Hond and his family were deported to the Westerbork transit camp on 21 June 1943. When asked in Westerbork on 20 July 1943 who would volunteer for the next transport to the east, he is said to have replied: "Hinne-ni" ("Here see me"), Abraham's answer to God's command to sacrifice his son Isaac. He and his entire family were murdered in Auschwitz and Sobibor.

In 1966, the Amsterdam bridge number 257, which spans the Niewe Achtergracht and connects the Weesperstraat with the Weesperplein, was named after Meijer de Hond. The nameplate was unveiled by de Hond's friend Ben Italiaander, recipient of a last postcard from de Hond before his deportation.
