= Miguel de Ambiela =

Spanish composer

Miguel de Ambiela (1666 – 29 March 1733) was a Spanish composer. He was born at La Puebla de Albortón and became maestro de capilla at the Basilica of Our Lady of the Pillar, Saragossa. He was a composer employing conservative traditional polyphony. Some of his works are preserved in Latin American manuscripts. He died in Toledo, Spain, in his fifties.
