= Isabelle M. Germano =

American neurosurgeon

Isabelle M. Germano, MD, MBA
- Education: University of Turin Medical School University of California San Francisco Albert Eistein College of Medicine Montreal Neurological Institute McGill New York University Stern School of Business
- Occupation: Neurosurgeon

Isabelle M. Germano is an American academic neurosurgeon and professor of neurosurgery, neurology, oncology, radiation oncology, and global health at the Icahn School of Medicine at Mount Sinai.

== Education ==
After completing her secondary education at Liceo Classico Massimo d’Azeglio in Turin, and then attended the University of Turin Medical School for her Doctor of Medicine (MD) degree.

She completed her neurosurgery residency training at the University of California, San Francisco and the Albert Einstein College of Medicine, finishing in 1993. During her residency, she received additional training in epilepsy surgery at the University Hospital of Zürich in Switzerland. She further completed specialized fellowship training in epilepsy surgery, stereotactic treatments, and movement disorders under André Olivier at the Montreal Neurological Institute. Germano also earned a Master of Business Administration from the New York University Stern School of Business, where she later was an adjunct professor of economics in the MBA program.

== Career and research ==
Germano established the first National Institutes of Health (NIH)-funded neurosurgery laboratory dedicated to brain tumor research at Mount Sinai.

== Publications ==
=== Books (edited) ===
- Advanced Techniques in Image-Guided Brain and Spine Surgery. 2002, Thieme Publishers, New York
- LINAC and Gamma Knife Radiosurgery. American Association of Neurological Surgeons Press, Park Ridge, IL.
- Neurosurgery Treatment of Movement Disorders. American Association of Neurological Surgeons Press, Park Ridge, IL.
- Neurosurgery and Global Health. 2022, Springer Nature, Cham, Switzerland.
