= Germano Rocha =

Portuguese fado singer and restaurateur

- Born: Germano Rocha
- Origin: Portugal
- Genres: Fado
- Occupation: Fado singer
- Years active: 1970–present
- Website: germanorocha.ca

Germano Rocha is a fado singer and restaurant owner.

Germano Rocha was born to in Portugal; he moved to Canada in the 1970s.

== Discography ==
- Germano Rocha Chante Le Fado de Coimbra -Fado Triste/ Fado Hilario/ Rua De Capelao/ Coimbra Menina E Moca. EP 1960s Polydor France 27 273
