= Fernando Machado Soares =

Portuguese singer, poet, composer, jurist and judge

- Born: 3 September 1930; Azores, Portugal
- Died: 7 December 2014 (aged 84)
- Genres: Fado, Traditional music
- Occupations: composer, singer
- Instrument: guitar
- Years active: 1950s–present

Fernando Machado Soares (3 September 1930, in São Roque do Pico – 7 December 2014), was a Portuguese fado singer, poet, composer, jurist and judge.

== Early life ==
He was born in the municipality of São Roque, on the island of Pico, the archipelago of the Azores, a descendant of the last Captain-mor of Lajes do Pico.

== Career ==
He received his formal education at the Faculty of Law, at the University of Coimbra in the 1950s.

He participated in the film "Rapsódia Portuguesa".

After completing his university education he suspended his artistic pursuits, and concentrated on a career in law. However he accompanied the Academic Choir of Coimbra to the United States, where he sang in New York City (at Lincoln Center), Boston, Chicago and Atlanta. In addition, his tour allowed him to participate on an American television program on NBC. He became an author of various celebrated fados, that include "Balada da Despedida".

== See also ==
- Coimbra fado
