= Paulo Valentim (guitarist) =

Portuguese fado guitarist and composer

- Born: Portugal
- Genres: Fado
- Occupation: Composer
- Instrument: Guitar

Paulo Valentim is a Portuguese fado guitarist and composer. His compositions include Romper Madrugadas recorded by Katia Guerreiro.
