= José de Vaquedano =

Spanish composer (1642–1711)

Fray José de Vaquedano (Puente la Reina, 20 March 1642 - 17 February 1711 in Santiago de Compostela) was a Spanish composer and priest of the Trinitarian Order. He was named maestro de capilla at Santiago Cathedral in October 1680. His surviving works included various pieces of polychoral sacred music and around 47 villancicos, of which 26 celebrate the Feast of Saint James.

== Recordings ==
- José de Vaquedano: Renacemento e Barroco (Música Clásica Galega Volumen 2) by Grupo De Cámara Da Universidade De Santiago
- Jose de Baquedano: Musica para la catedral de Santiago by La Grande Chapelle, Albert Recasens 2022
