= Hermínia Silva =

Portuguese fado singer

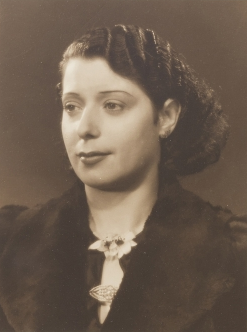
- Born: 23 October 1907
- Died: 13 June 1993 (aged 85)

Herminia Silva Leite Guerreiro GCIH (23 October 1907 - 13 June 1993) was a Portuguese fado singer.

== Life ==
Silva was born at São José Hospital to Josefina Augusta. At the age of 10, she began singing while she worked as a seamstress. Her career spanned seventy years.

== Honors ==
- Commander of the Order of Prince Henry (24 August 1985)
- Grand Cross of the Order of Prince Henry (10 June 1990)
