= Daniël D'Hondt =

Belgian footballer

Danny D'Hondt
Personal information
- Full name: Daniël D'Hondt
- Date of birth: 21 September 1961 (age 65)
- Place of birth: Dendermonde, Belgium
- Height: 1.87 m (6 ft 2 in)
- Position: Goalkeeper

Youth career
- AV Dendermonde
- 1979–1984: Lokeren
- 1980–1981: → Sint-Niklaas

Senior career*
Years	Team	Apps	(Gls)
1984–1995	Lokeren	234	(0)
1995–1996	Zulte Waregem	8	(0)
1996–1997	Aalst	34	(0)
1997–1999	Lokeren	55	(0)
1999	Dinamo Tbilisi	9	(0)
2000	NAC Breda	4	(0)
2000–2001	K.V.C. Westerlo	0	(0)

Managerial career
- 2009: VW Hamme
- * Club domestic league appearances and goals

Daniël D'Hondt (born 21 September 1961) is a Belgian retired professional goalkeeper who ended his career in 2001.

== Playing career ==
D'Hondt spent the most of his career in Lokeren. In summer 2000, he joined NAC Breda.

Later he moved abroad and joined Dinamo Tbilisi as well, becoming only third player from outside the former Soviet Union to play in the Georgian Premier League after Carlos Alberto Pinha da Rocha and Uchechukwu Uwakwe.

== Coaching career ==
After D'Hondt became coach and managed VW Hamme in 2009.
