= Jacob van Deventer (cartographer) =

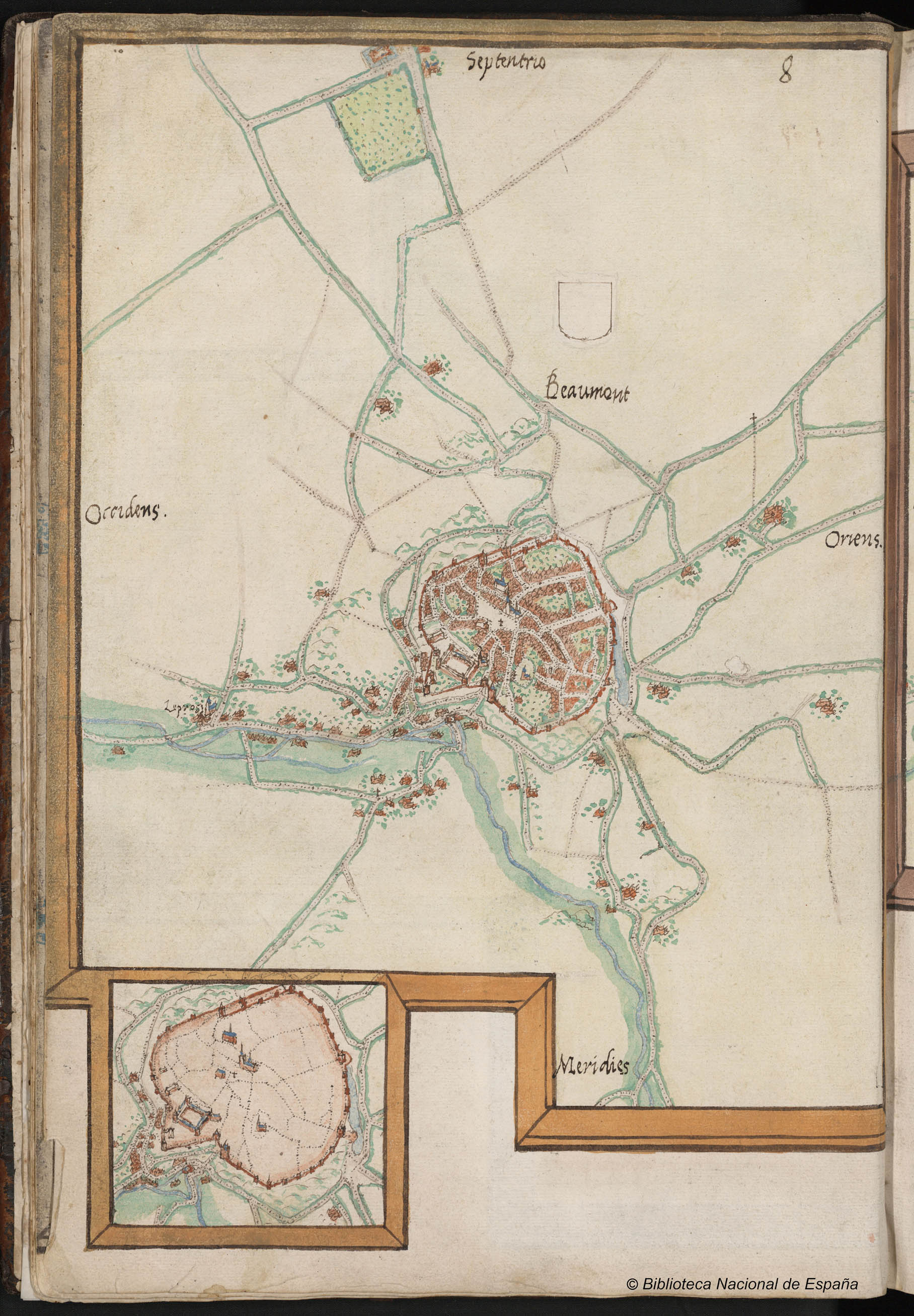
Example of a map by Jacob van Deventer depicting Beaumont and the Château de Beaumont

Jacob Roelofs van Deventer (c. 1500/1505 in Kampen – 1575 in Cologne) was a Netherlandish cartographer of the Renaissance. He is today best known for his work in systematically cartographing all towns and cities of the Habsburg Netherlands of his time. Van Deventer was among the first to make systematic use of triangulation, a technique whose theory was described by Gemma Frisius, one of his teachers at the University of Leuven.

== Biography ==
Little biographical information exists about Jacob van Deventer. His patronage would suggest he was Catholic. Despite his name, he was probably not born in Deventer, but in Kampen in the north of the Netherlands. His mother married a man called Roelof in Deventer in 1510, and Jacob probably grew up there. He first appears in the sources on 24 April 1520, when he enrolled at the University of Leuven under the name of "Jacobus de Daventria". On this basis, his date of birth is conjectured to have been around 1500–1505. In Leuven, Jacob's interests were first directed towards medicine and philosophy, but he then began to take an interest in geography and cartography. He later moved to Mechelen, from where in 1572 he relocated to Cologne to flee the upheavals of the Dutch Revolt against the Spanish rule. During his career as a cartographer in the Spanish royal service, he earned himself the title of "Imperial Cartographer" from emperor Charles V in 1540 (later changed to that of "Royal Cartographer", after the emperor's abdication in 1555).

== Works ==
Jacob van Deventer was among the first to make systematic use of triangulation, a technique whose theory was described by his contemporary Gemma Frisius in his 1533 book, Libellus de locorum describendorum ratione. In 1536 he produced a printed map of Brabant, the first such map to be published in the Netherlands. He then launched into an impressive career as a mapmaker. In 1559, he was tasked by King Philip II with the project that was to become his life's work: the systematic cartography of all cities of the Netherlands. The resulting maps were kept unpublished because of their military value. As a result, they later became forgotten and were rediscovered only in the late 19th century.

Jacobus van Deventer worked on this monumental project until his death in 1575. In the course of fifteen years, he created between 250 and 260 city maps, covering an area from Friesland to what is today the north of France, and reaching into Luxembourg and the west of Germany.

All maps were made according to the same scheme, using a scale of c. 1:8,000. Most were made in three versions: the first was a "minute" version or first draft of the city in its nearer surroundings, based on topographical data that was collected by surveying on the site, with texts in Dutch. Of these draft versions, 152 were discovered in 1859 in various provincial archives in the Netherlands and in the Royal Library of Brussels. (A number that were kept in Middelburg were later destroyed during World War II and are preserved only as copies).

The second stage was a "main chart" (netkaart or hoofdkaart), representing a cleaned-up elaborated version of the previous minute map, with texts in Latin.

A third map, termed a bijkaart (ancillary chart) was produced that showed only the city itself, without the surroundings. It contains only the fortification works and canals, and the principal buildings and streets. The main charts with their ancillary charts were preserved as a three-volume atlas in the National Library of Madrid. Of this, one volume has been lost; 179 maps are preserved (in addition to 152 drafts).
