= Henricus Canisius =

Dutch canonist and historian

Henricus Canisius (1562, Nijmegen - 2 September 1610, Ingolstadt) was a Dutch canonist and historian.

== Biography ==
Canisius was born Hendrik de Hondt ("The Dog", Latinized to Canisius), the nephew of Saint Peter Canisius. He studied at the University of Leuven, and in 1590 was appointed professor of canon law at Ingolstadt.

== Works ==
Canisius's works on canon law include:

- Summa Juris Canonici (Ingolstadt, 1594)
- Praelectiones Academicae (Ingolstadt, 1609)
- Comment. in lib. III decretalium (Ingolstadt, 1629)
- De Sponsalibus et Matrimonio (Ingolstadt, 1613)

A complete edition of his canonical writings appeared in Leuven in 1649 and in Cologne in 1662.

His major historical work was Antiquae Lectiones, seu antiqua monumenta ad historiam mediae aetatis illustrandam (6 volumes, Ingolstadt, 1601–1604). In 1608 a seventh volume, Promptuarium Ecclesiasticum, was added by way of supplement. The Catholic Encyclopedia describes the work as disorganized and containing "much matter of minor value"; Basnage produced a heavily edited version under the title Thesaurus Monumentorum ecclesiasticorum et historicorum (7 vols., Antwerp, 1725).

Canisius edited for the first time the Chronica Victoris Episcop. Tunnunensis et Joannis Episcop. Biclariensis, and the Legatio Luitprandi (Ingolstadt, 1600). He also produced an edition of the Historiae miscellae Pauli Diaconi (Ingolstadt, 1603).
