= Theodorich Canisius =

Theodorich Canisius (1532 in Nijmegen – September 27, 1606 in Ingolstadt) was a Jesuit academic.

== Biography ==
Canisius was a half-brother of St. Peter Canisius. After winning, at the age of twenty-two, the highest academic distinction at Louvain, he decided to follow his stepbrother and enter the Society of Jesus, and was sent to St. Ignatius of Loyola in Rome, who received him into the Society.

On the completion of his novitiate, Theodorich was appointed professor of theology in Vienna, but was soon after appointed rector of the Jesuit College at Munich. Here, in 1562, one of the first productions in Germany of the morality play Homulus (corresponding to the English Everyman or the Dutch Elckerlijc) was given in Latin by the students under his direction. From Munich, where he was succeeded in 1565 by the celebrated Paul Hoffaeus, he was transferred to Dillingen, where for twenty years he presided over the college and the academy and laboured with zeal and success for the improvement of studies and for the religious training of the students. From 1565 to 1582 he held the office of chancellor of the university.

In company with his distinguished brother, he attended the first provincial congregation of the Society of Jesus in Upper Germany, and furthered important reforms in the teaching of philosophy. In 1585 he was made rector of the Jesuit College of Ingolstadt, and in this capacity became a member of the German commission which tested in practice the first draft of the Ratio Studiorum.

At length, having spent thirty years at the head of three of the foremost colleges of Germany, he was sent to Lucerne in Switzerland to enjoy a period of rest; but soon again, at the age of sixty-three, he had to undertake the government of the college of Ingolstadt. Two years later, on the advice of his physician, he was relieved of the burden and allowed to return to Lucerne. A fortnight after his arrival the death of St. Peter Canisius was announced; the shock deprived Theodorich of memory and speech, an affliction which he bore with exemplary patience for seven years. For his amiable disposition and spotless purity of life he deservedly received the surname of Angelus 'angel'. In 1604, he was transferred again to Ingolstadt, where he died, and was interred in the church of the Holy Cross.
