= Pedro Riquet =

Spanish composer

Pedro Riquet (fl. 1598–1640) was a Spanish composer. His best known work is "Romance: Ya es tiempo de Recoger " of 1640.
