= Beatriz da Conceição =

Portuguese fado singer (1939–2015)

Beatriz da Conceição (born 21 August 1939 in Porto - 26 November 2015 in Lisbon) was a Portuguese fado singer. Her discography includes performances with António Rocha for Paul Van Nevel with the Huelgas Ensemble. She died at age 76 on 26 November 2015.
