= Alfredo Marceneiro =

Portuguese fado singer (1891–1982)

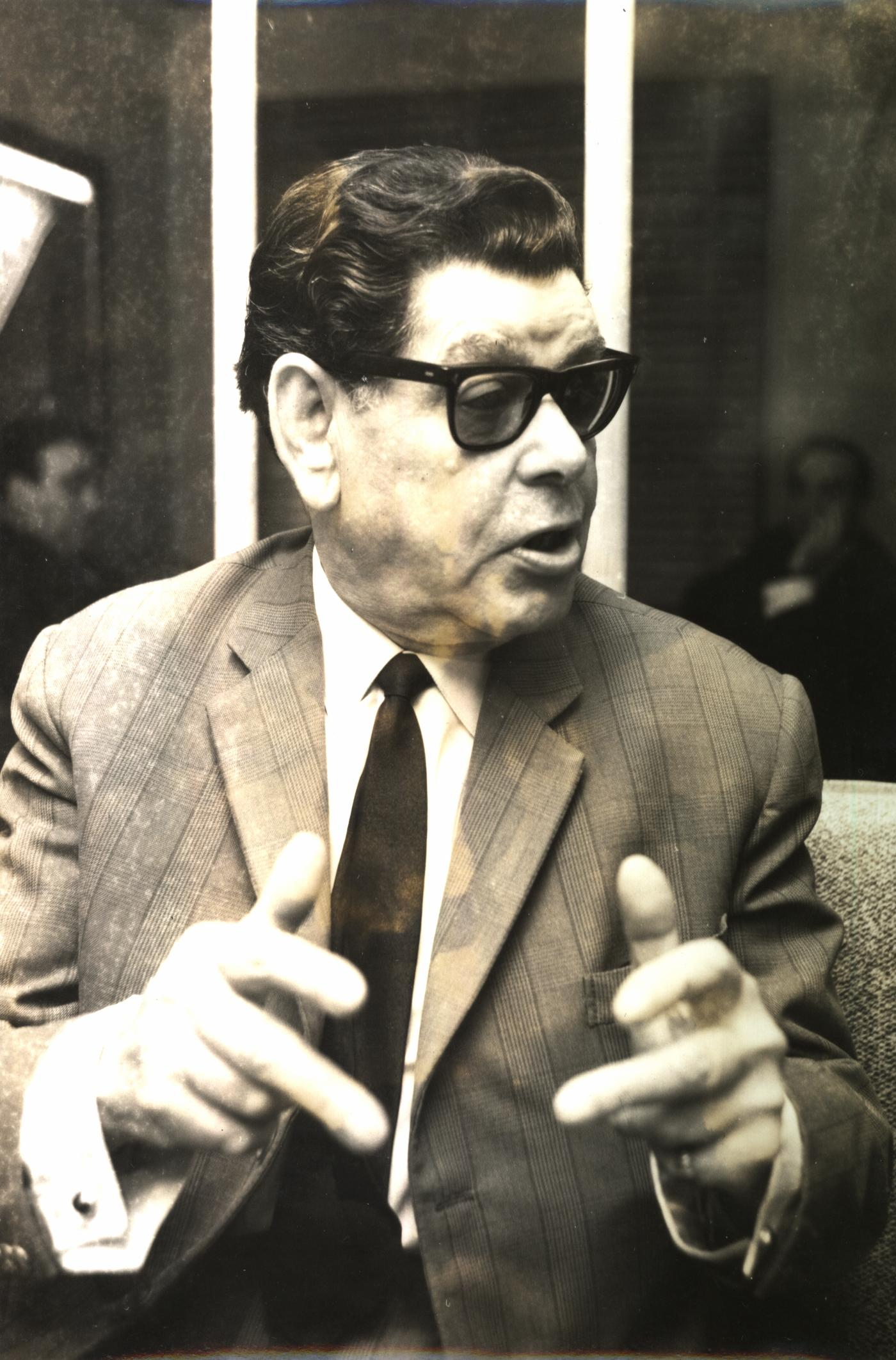

Background information
- Born: Alfredo Rodrigo Duarte; 25 February 1891
- Origin: Lisbon, Portugal
- Died: 26 June 1982 (aged 91)
- Genres: Fado
- Occupation: Singer
- Website: http://www.alfredomarceneiro.com/

Alfredo Rodrigo Duarte ComIH (25 February 1891 – 26 June 1982), better known as Alfredo Marceneiro, was a Portuguese fado singer. His stage name is derived from his original profession as a joiner (marceneiro, in Portuguese). Marceneiro is considered a standard against whom generations of fado singers are still measured.

Marceneiro died on 26 June 1982.On 10 June 1984 he was awarded posthumously Commander of the Order of Infante D. Henrique by the President of the Portuguese Republic, Ramalho Eanes.
