= Bartolomeo Tromboncino =

Italian composer

Bartolomeo Tromboncino (c. 1470 – 1535 or later) was an Italian composer of the middle Renaissance. He is mainly famous as a composer of frottole; he is principally infamous for murdering his wife. He was born in Verona and died in or near Venice.

== Life ==
There is little information on his early life, as is common for most composers of the time. He mentions in a letter that he was originally from Verona, and it is most likely that he grew up in Mantua. Until around 1500 he lived and worked in Mantua, though he made occasional trips to adjacent cities such as Ferrara, Este, Vicenza, Milan, and Pavia, especially when he was in trouble. He fled Mantua in 1495 for unknown reasons, returning later that same year. In 1499 he murdered his wife when he discovered her in flagrante delicto but, unlike Gesualdo a hundred years later, he may have spared the man (the sources are contradictory on this detail). Curiously, he seems to have been pardoned again and again for his misdeeds, but he left Mantua again "without permission, and for despicable reasons", as recorded in a letter from one of the Gonzaga family, his employers. His skill as a composer probably endeared him to Isabella d'Este, one of the great patrons of the arts of the time, and this connection may have assisted him in attaining pardons for his various murders and misdemeanors.

From 1502 Tromboncino was employed by the even more infamous Lucrezia Borgia in Ferrara, where he wrote music for the famous intermedi of her opulent court, and most significantly for her wedding to Alfonso d'Este. Sometime before 1521 he moved to Venice, where he most likely spent the remainder of his life, seemingly in rather more placid circumstances.

== Music and influence ==
In spite of his stormy, erratic, and possibly criminal life, much of his music is in the light current form of the frottola, a predecessor to the madrigal. He was a trombonist, as shown by his name, and sometimes employed in that capacity; however he apparently wrote no strictly instrumental music (or none survives). He also wrote some serious sacred music: seventeen laude, a motet and a setting of the Lamentations of Jeremiah. Stylistically, the sacred works are typical of the more conservative music of the early 16th century, using non-imitative polyphony over a cantus firmus, alternating sectionally with more homophonic textures or with unadorned plainsong. His frottolas, by far the largest and most historically significant part of his output (176 in all) are more varied than those of the other famous frottolist, Marchetto Cara, and they also tend to be more polyphonic than is typical for most frottolas of the time; in this way they anticipate the madrigal, the first collections of which began to be published near the very end of Tromboncino's life, and in the city where he lived (for example Verdelot's Primo libro di Madrigali of 1533, published in Venice). The major differences between the late frottolas of Tromboncino and the earliest madrigals were not so much musical as in the structure of the verse they set.

The poetry that Tromboncino set tended to be by the most famous writers of the time; he set Petrarch, Galeotto, Sannazaro, and others; he even set a poem by Michelangelo, Come haro dunque ardire, which was part of a collection Tromboncino published in 1518.

== Sources ==
- Gustave Reese, Music in the Renaissance. New York, W.W. Norton & Co., 1954. (ISBN 0-393-09530-4)
- The New Grove Dictionary of Music and Musicians, ed. Stanley Sadie. 20 vol. London, Macmillan Publishers Ltd., 1980. (ISBN 1-56159-174-2)
