= Hondius =

Hondius can refer to two possibly unrelated families of engravers and cartographers, who both moved from Flanders to the Dutch Republic in the 1590s:

- Amsterdam family originating from Ghent:
  - Jodocus Hondius (1563–1612)
    - Jodocus Hondius II (1593–1629), first son of Jodocus I
    - Hendrik Hondius II (1597–1651), second son of Jodocus I
  - Jacomina Hondius (1558–1628), Flemish-Dutch calligrapher, sister of Jodocus Hondius
- The Hague family originating from Duffel:
  - Hendrik Hondius I (1573–1650)
    - Willem Hondius (c. 1598–1650s), one of his sons
    - Hendrik Hondius III (1615–1677), another son
- Abraham Hondius (ca. 1631–1691), Dutch Golden Age painter

== See also ==
- Hondius (disambiguation)
