= Marchetto Cara =

Italian composer

Marchetto Cara (c. 1465 – probably 1525) was an Italian composer, lutenist and singer of the Renaissance. He was mainly active in Mantua, was well-connected with the Gonzaga and Medici families, and, along with Bartolomeo Tromboncino, was well known as a composer of frottolas.

== Life ==
Very little is known of his early life. By 1494, he was already employed by the Gonzaga court at Mantua, and he evidently stayed there, without interruption except for travel to sing in nearby cities, until his death. Among his duties were directing the singers both in the Cathedral of San Pietro (Mantua) and in the private estate of the Gonzaga family. As lovers and patrons of music, they employed numerous musicians, and Cara was chief among them: he wrote music for weddings, for state occasions, for intermedi, and for private entertainments, and in so doing created some of the most refined light music of the time. Along with Tromboncino, he was the most famous composer of frottole, and his compositions continued to be collected and published after his death.

Most likely, he died in 1525, since his widow remarried in early 1526, and there was at the time a legal requirement for a widow to wait nine months prior to remarriage. When he died, he was a wealthy man, owning two houses in the city and two large country estates: evidently, the Gonzaga family paid him well.

Cara was famous not only as a composer, but as a singer and a lutenist. He sang at Mantua, for his employers, but also traveled throughout northern Italy, singing for the Medici, the Bembo family, the Bentivoglio family in Bologna, and other aristocrats in Verona, Venice, Padua, Pesaro, Cremona, as well as other cities. Baldassare Castiglione heard him sing, and wrote of him in his famous Book of the Courtier (Venice, 1528), in the same paragraph in which he praises Leonardo da Vinci:

And no lesse doeth our Marchetto Cara move in his singinge, but with a more softe harmonye, that by a delectable waye and full of mourninge swetnesse maketh tender and perceth the mind, and sweetly imprinteth in it a passion full of great delite (translated by Sir Thomas Hoby, 1561).

== Works ==
Though predominantly a composer of frottolas, a light secular form and ancestor of the madrigal, he also wrote a few sacred pieces, including a three-voice Salve Regina (one of the Marian Antiphons) as well as seven laude spirituali. His frottolas are for the most part homophonic, with short passages of imitation only at the beginnings of phrases; they are catchy, singable, and often use dance-like rhythms. The poetry for most of his 100 frottolas is anonymous, though the authors of 16 poems have been identified. Most of the poems are in the form of the barzellette, but there are also strambotti, sonnets, capitoli and ode. Almost everything is in a verse-refrain format. One of Cara's best-known frottolas, Io non compro più speranza was composed in 1504 and published in the first book of Frottolas of Petrucci .

Some of his later frottolas are more serious in character, and foreshadow the development of the madrigal, which took place in the late 1520s and 1530s, right after his death.
