= Paul Van Nevel =

Belgian conductor, musicologist and art historian

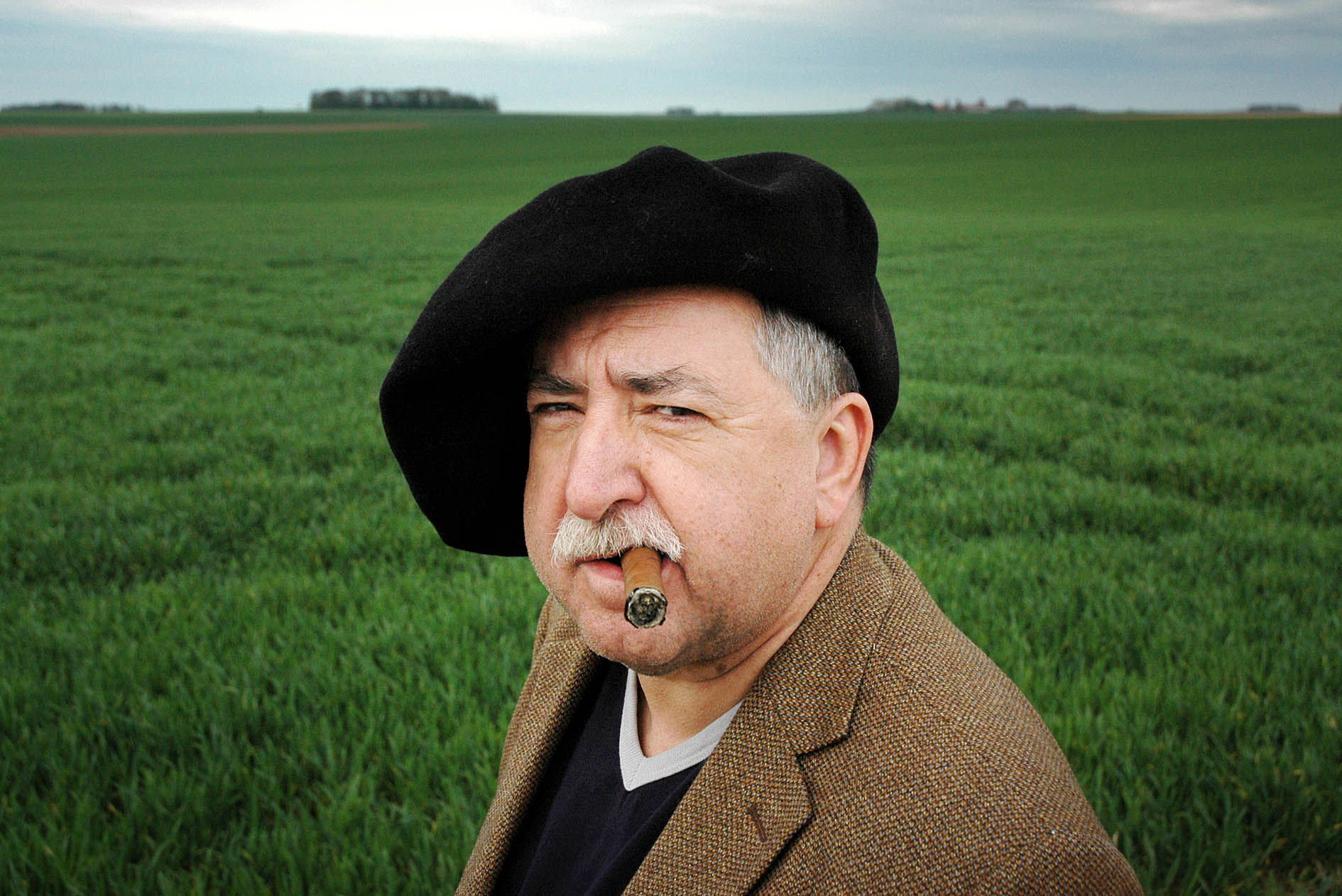
Paul Van Nevel, 2003.

Paul Van Nevel (born 4 February 1946) is a Belgian conductor, musicologist and art historian. In 1971 he founded the Huelgas Ensemble, a choir dedicated to polyphony from the Middle Ages and the Renaissance. Van Nevel is known for hunting out little known polyphonic medieval works to perform.

He grew up in a musical family. From the age of 11 to 18 he used to sing four hours a day. His father played violin and encouraged his son to play every instrument in the house. While his father loved Wagner, his son Paul favoured Béla Bartók. His nephew Erik Van Nevel is also a choral conductor.

From 1969 to 1971 he studied early music at the Schola Cantorum Basiliensis in Switzerland. There he founded the Huelgas Ensemble, taking the name from the famous Codex Las Huelgas at the Cistercian monastery near Burgos which Van Nevel visited as a 24-year-old. He was able to spend two weeks studying the manuscript with the aid of a recommendation letter from the Belgian authorities.

Van Nevel teaches at the Conservatory of Amsterdam and has been guest conductor of the Collegium Vocale Gent, the Netherlands Chamber Choir and the choir of the Netherlands Bach Society. In 1994 he was awarded the Prix Paris in honorem of the Academy Charles Cros. His recordings with the Huelgas Ensemble received numerous awards including the Diapason d'Or in 1996 and the MIDEM Cannes Classical Award for best choral music in 1998.

Van Nevel is well known for his fondness for cigars, this interest finding musical outlet in The Art of the Cigar (2011, DHM).

In 1994 he was sentenced to three years and four months in prison for stealing, in 1988, seven rare musical works in the Museo Bibliografico Musicale di Bologna.

== Partial bibliography ==
- 1976 Polyfonie en ars subtilior. Uitgeverij de Monte, Louvain, 75p
- 1992 Nicolas Gombert et het avontuur van de Vlaamse Polyfonie (superseded by revised edition in French)
- 2004 Nicolas Gombert et l'aventure de la polyphonie franco-flamande trans. Eva de Volder, Kargo Paris ISBN 2-84162-087-5 (marked "édition définitive" on frontispiece)
