= Fado =

Portuguese music genre

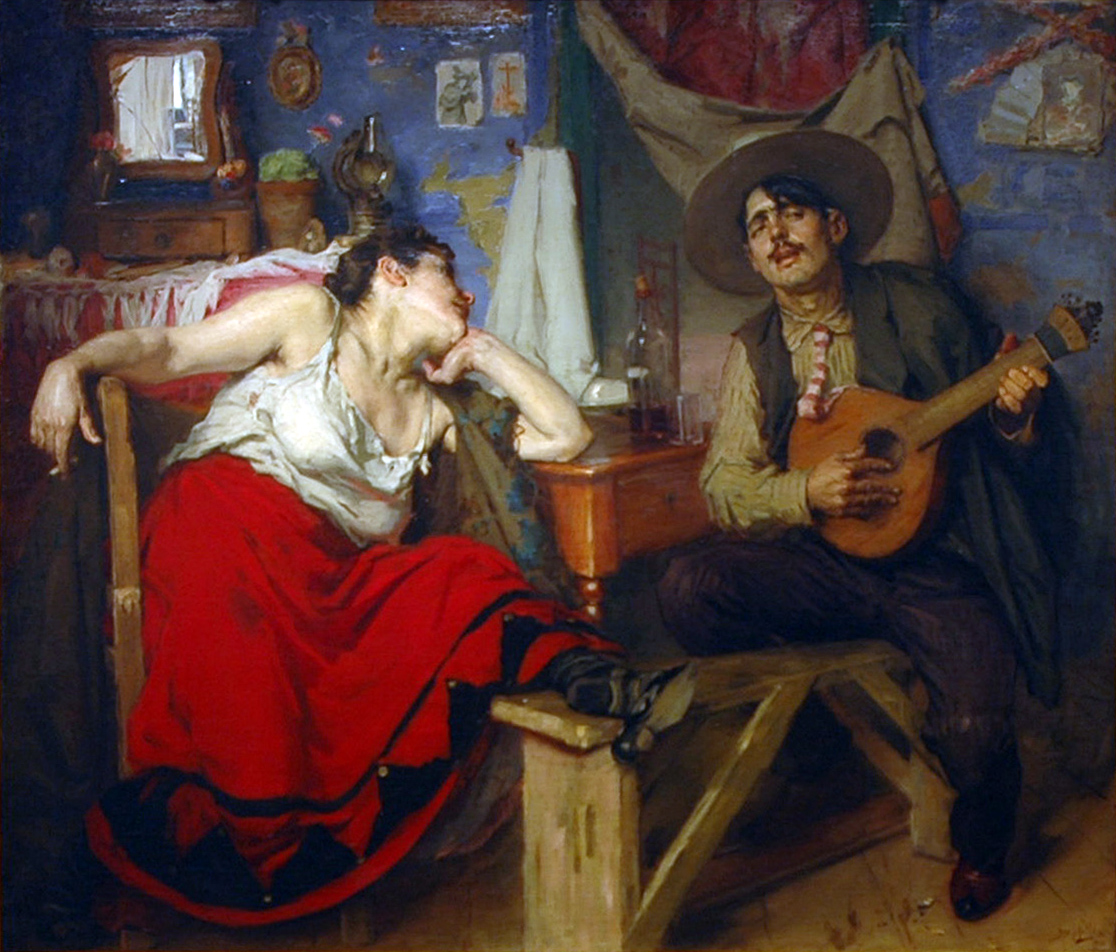
- Fado, painting by José Malhoa (1910)
- Stylistic origins: Portuguese music
- Cultural origins: Early 19th-century Lisbon, Portugal
- Derivative forms: Coimbra fado

Other topics
- Kroncong

Fado, urban popular song of Portugal
- UNESCO Intangible Cultural Heritage
- Country: Portugal
- Reference: 00563
- Region: Europe and North America

Inscription history
- Inscription: 2011 (6th session)
- List: Representative

Fado (Portuguese pronunciation: [ˈfaðu]; "destiny, fate") is a music genre which can be traced to the 1820s in Lisbon, Portugal, but probably has much earlier origins. Fado historian and scholar Rui Vieira Nery states that "the only reliable information on the history of fado was orally transmitted and goes back to the 1820s and 1830s at best. But even that information was frequently modified within the generational transmission process that made it reach us today."

Although the origins are difficult to trace, today fado is commonly regarded as simply a form of song which can be about anything, but must follow a certain traditional structure. In popular belief, fado is a form of music characterized by mournful tunes and lyrics, often about the sea or the life of the poor, and infused with a sense of resignation, fate and melancholy. This is loosely captured by the Portuguese word saudade, or longing, symbolizing a feeling of loss (a permanent, irreparable loss and its consequent lifelong damage). This is similar to the character of several musical genres in Portuguese ex-colonies such as morna from Cape Verde, which may be historically linked to fado in its earlier form and have retained its rhythmic heritage. This connection to the music of a historic Portuguese urban and maritime proletariat (sailors, bohemians, dock workers, prostitutes, tavern frequenters, port traders, fishwives and other working-class people) can also be found in Brazilian modinha and Indonesian kroncong, although all these music genres subsequently developed their own independent traditions.

Some famous singers of fado include Alfredo Marceneiro, Amália Rodrigues, Carlos do Carmo, Mariza, Ana Moura, António Zambujo, and Camané. On 27 November 2011, fado was added to the UNESCO Intangible Cultural Heritage Lists, after an initiative by former Lisbon mayor Pedro Santana Lopes in 2009, then the singers Mariza and Carlos do Carmo acted as ambassadors for Fado's candidacy.

Fado is one of two Portuguese music traditions part of the lists, the other being Cante Alentejano.

Modern fado is popular in Portugal, and has been performed by many renowned musicians.

== Etymology ==
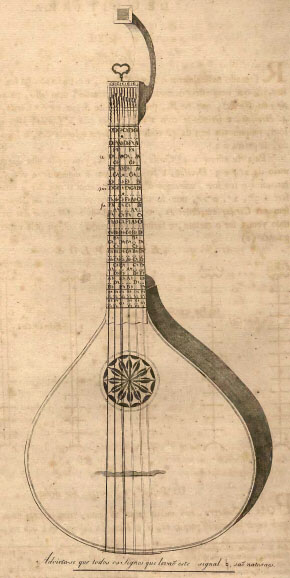
Portuguese guitar

The word fado possibly comes from the Latin word fatum ("fate", "death" or "utterance"). The word is linked to the music genre itself, although both meanings are approximately the same in the two languages. Nevertheless, many songs play on the double meaning, such as the Amália Rodrigues song "Com que voz", which includes the lyric "Com que voz chorarei meu triste fado" ("With what voice should I lament my sad fate/sing my sad fado?").

Perhaps shedding light on fadista are the Proto-Celtic *wātis (prophet, poet; see Proto-Celtic language), the English-Latin vates (Celtic bard, prophet, philosopher), and the Old French fatiste (poet), evolving to the Middle French fatiste (actor in a medieval mystery play).

== History ==
Fado appeared during the early 19th century in Lisbon, and is believed to have its origins in the bohemian areas of the capital, such as Bairro Alto, Mouraria and Alfama districts.

A different theory about the origin of fado was defended by Brazilian musical critic José Ramos Tinhorão, who said that fado was brought into Portugal by the hands and craft of a mixed-race Brazilian musician called Domingos Caldas Barbosa in the mid 18th century.

There are numerous theories about the origin of fado. Some trace its origins or influences to the medieval "cantigas de amigo" (song of a friend), others suggest some ancient Moorish influence, and yet others point to the chants of (enslaved) Africans sailing at sea. None of these are compelling. It possibly evolved and formed from various older musical genres.

Fado performers in the middle of the 19th century were mainly from the urban working-class, namely sailors, bohemians and courtesans in popular taverns, who not only sang but also danced and beat the fado. During the second half of the 19th century, the dance rhythms faded away, and the performers became merely singers (fadistas).

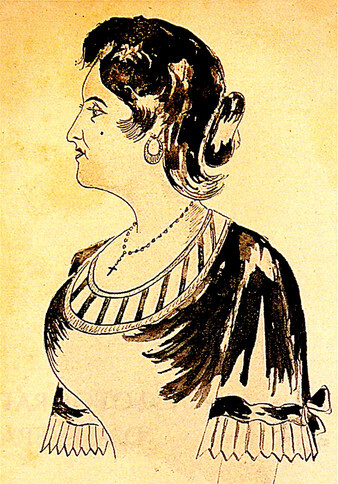
Maria Severa, fado singer (1820–1846)

The 19th century's fadista Maria Severa, a half Cigano woman considered scandalous by some at the time, was the artist who made this genre famous.

More recently Amália Rodrigues, known as the "Rainha do Fado" ("Queen of Fado") was most influential in popularizing fado worldwide. Fado performances today may be accompanied by a string quartet or a full orchestra.

== Musicological aspects ==
Fado typically employs major or minor tonal harmony, sometimes switching between the two during a melody or verse change. A particular stylistic trait of fado is the use of rubato, where the music pauses at the end of a phrase and the singer holds the note for dramatic effect. The music uses double-time rhythm and triple-time (waltz style).

== Varieties ==
There are two main varieties of fado, linked respectively to the cities of Lisbon and Coimbra.

The Lisbon style is better known, owing much to the popularity of Amália Rodrigues. It has been suggested that fado appeared on the streets of Lisbon only after 1840. Before then, the sailor's fado was sung at the bow of a boat, serving as a model for the first fados sung on land. Lisbon hosts a Fado Museum.

=== Coimbra fado ===
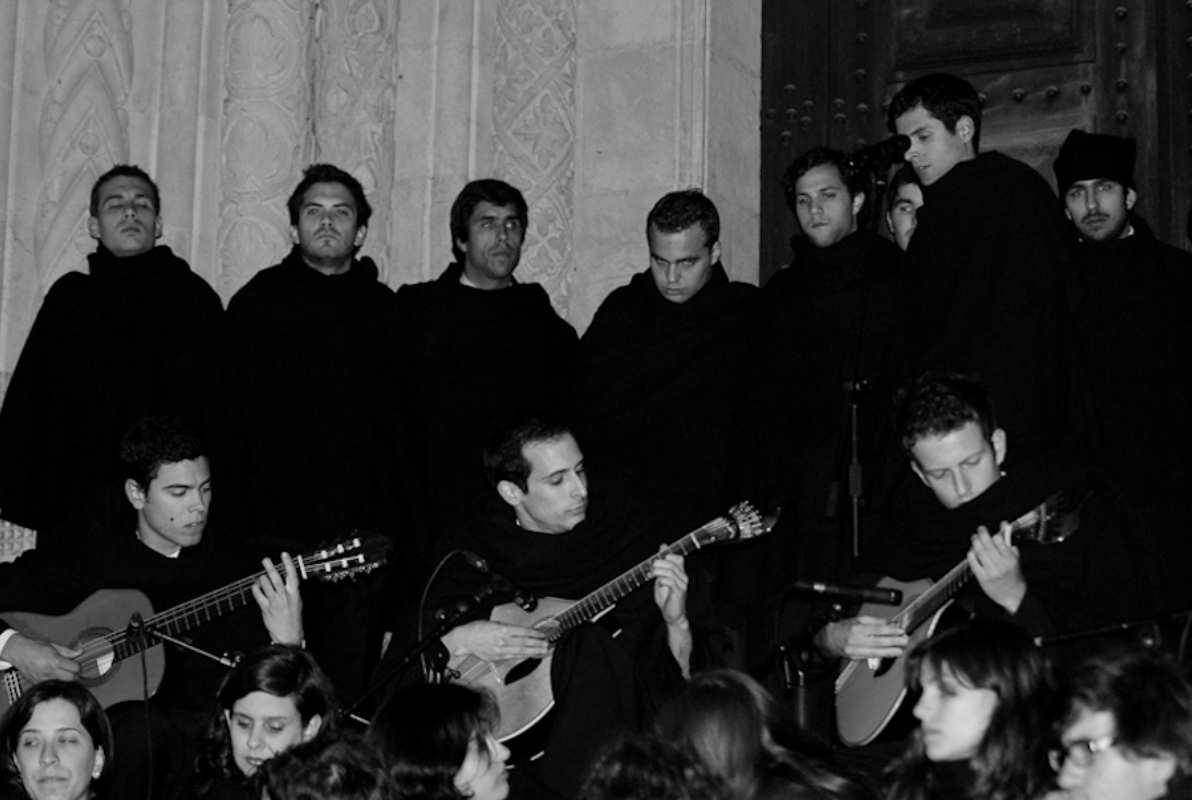
Coimbra students playing fado in a serenade at the front door of the Old Cathedral of Coimbra (Sé Velha)

The fado style of Coimbra is traditionally linked to the city's university and the style of medieval serenading troubadours. It is sung exclusively by men; both the singers and musicians wear the academic outfit (traje académico): dark robe, cape and leggings. Dating to the troubadour tradition of medieval times, it is sung at night, almost in the dark, in city squares or streets. Typical venues are the steps of the Santa Cruz Monastery and the Old Cathedral of Coimbra. It is also customary to organize serenades where songs are performed before the window of a woman to be courted.

As in Lisbon, Coimbra fado is accompanied by the guitarra portuguesa and viola (a type of guitar). The Coimbra guitar has evolved into an instrument different from that of Lisbon, with its own tuning, sound colouring, and construction. Artur Paredes, a progressive and innovative singer, revolutionised the tuning of the guitar and the style with which it accompanied Coimbra fado. Artur Paredes was the father of Carlos Paredes. He followed in his father's footsteps and expanded on his work, making the Portuguese guitar an instrument known around the world.

In the 1950s, a new movement led the singers of Coimbra to adopt the ballad and folklore. They began interpreting lines of the great poets, both classical and contemporary, as a form of resistance to the Salazar dictatorship. In this movement, names such as Adriano Correia de Oliveira and José Afonso (Zeca Afonso) had a leading role in popular music during the Carnation Revolution of 1974.

Some of the most famous fados of Coimbra include: Fado Hilário, Saudades de Coimbra ("Do Choupal até à Lapa"), Balada da Despedida ("Coimbra tem mais encanto, na hora da despedida" – the first phrases are often more recognizable than the song titles), O meu menino é d'oiro, and Samaritana. The "judge-singer" Fernando Machado Soares is an important figure, being the author of some of those famous fados.

It is not a Coimbra fado, but a popular song that is the best known title referring to this city: Coimbra é uma lição, which had success with titles such as April in Portugal.

== See also ==
- Fados, a 2007 movie about fado by Spanish director Carlos Saura
- List of fado musicians
