= Jacomina Hondius =

Flemish and Netherlandish calligrapher

- Born: 24 June 1558; Wakken
- Died: 2 January 1628; Amsterdam
- Other names: Jacomijntje de Hond; Jacquemyne Hondius
- Occupation: calligrapher
- Years active: 1594
- Known for: first published woman calligrapher in Europe
- Notable work: Contributed to Theatrum artis scribendi, 1594

Jacomina Hondius (Latinized version of her Dutch name: Jacomijntje de Hond) (24 June 1558 – 2 January 1628) was a Flemish and Dutch calligrapher notable for being the first female European calligrapher to have signed examples of her work published.

== Biography ==
=== Early life ===
Hondius was born on 24 June 1558 in Wakken in the County of Flanders (now in Belgium), the daughter of Petronella van Havertuyn and Olivier de Hondt, a bailiff. She grew up in Ghent.

In 1584 she moved from Flanders to London with her brother Jodocus Hondius. The move was prompted by religious difficulties in the Low Countries.

A year later, on 23 November 1585 she married Petrus Montanus (Pieter van den Berghe; 1560–1625), an engraver and cartographer, in London. She was 27 years old.

Jacomina Hondius had five children, all sons, one of whom, Samuel Montanus (1592-1669), himself became an engraver, and two of whom went into book trades.

Jodocus Hondius, Petrus Montanus, and Hondius' brother-in-law Petrus Kaerius (Pieter van den Keere)(1571 – c. 1646), himself an engraver, formed the nucleus of what was to become "the well known family of cartographers, Hondius."

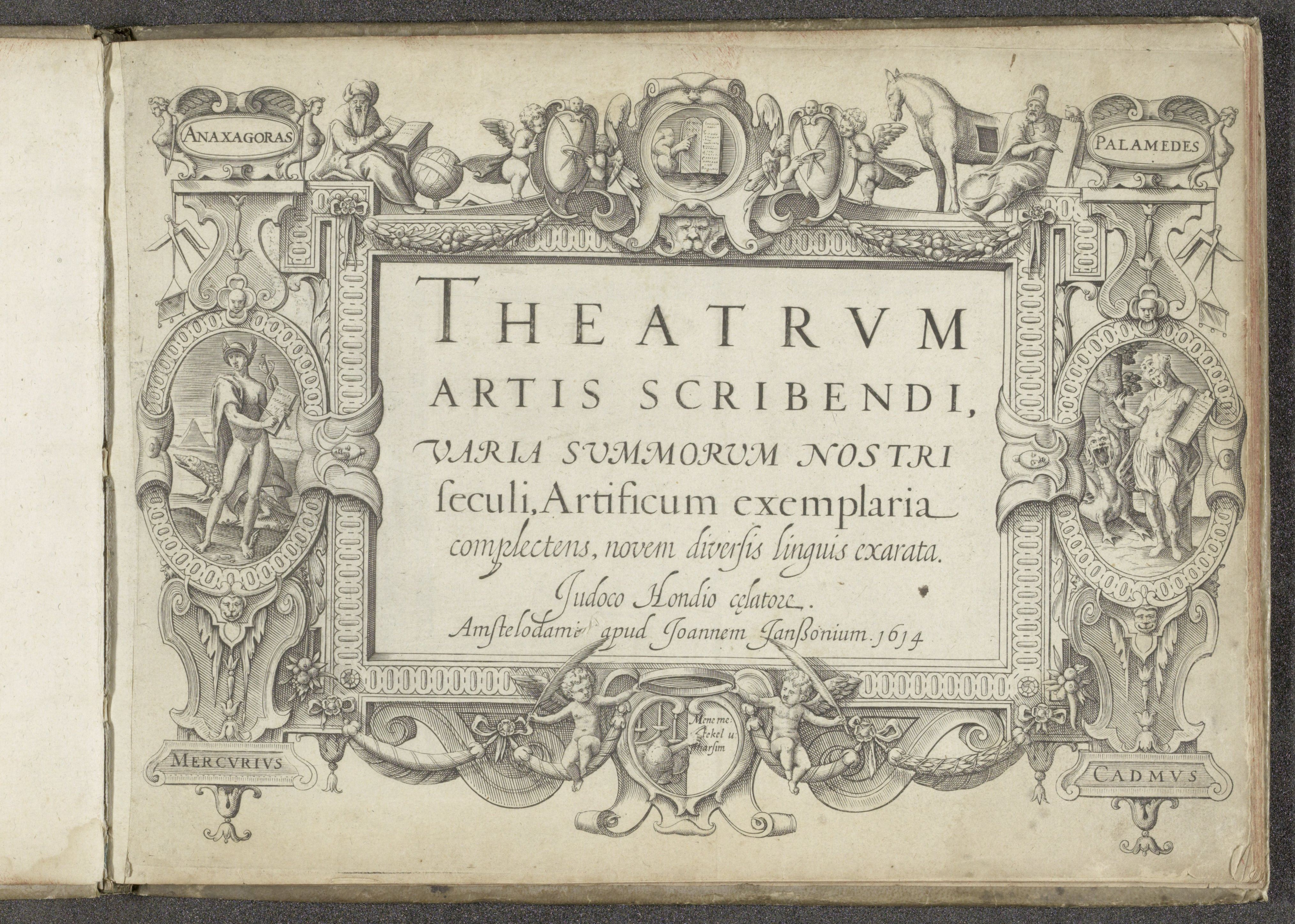
Title page, Theatrum artis scribendi (1614 edition)

=== Career ===
Hondius contributed two signed plates to her brother Jodocus Hondius' anthology of European calligraphy, Theatrum artis scribendi (1594), a calligraphy copybook that brought together the work of several European writing masters. The book included examples of calligraphy in several languages and writing styles and was intended as a model book for students and professional scribes.

Her work appeared under the name "Jacquemyne Hondius" alongside specimens by established calligraphers such as John de Beauchesne, whose writing manuals were among the earliest printed copybooks in England.

Women rarely appeared as named contributors in printed writing manuals, and Hondius's signed plates are among the earliest known examples of a woman's calligraphy published in print in early modern Europe.

She does not appear to have published anything further under her own name.

=== Later life and death ===
She lived in London from 1584 to 1595, in Vlissingen from 1595 to 1598, in Middelburg, Zeeland from 1598 to 1602 and in Amsterdam from 1602 until her death at age 69 in 1628.

== See also ==
- Theatrum artis scribendi
- List of female calligraphers
