= Theatrum artis scribendi =

Book by Jodocus Hondius

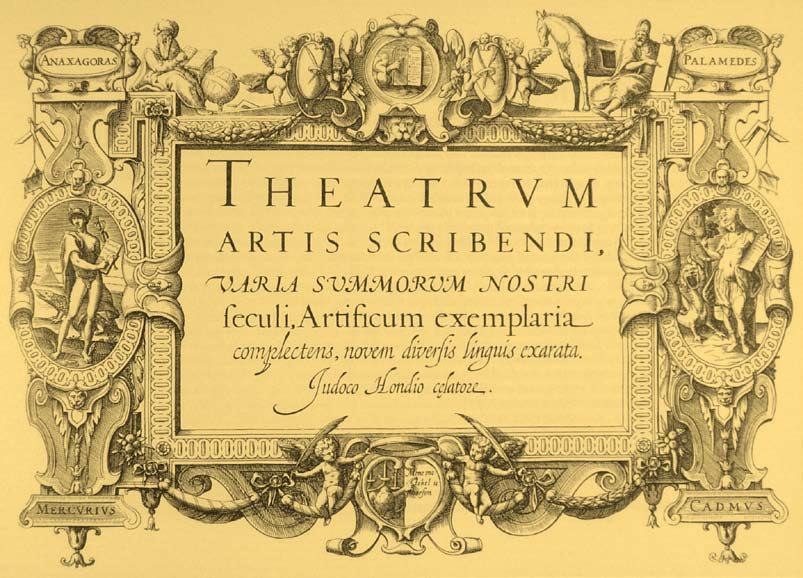
Title page of Theatrum Artis Scribendi, designed and engraved by Jodocus Hondius

Theatrum Artis Scribendi is a book about calligraphy by Jodocus Hondius. The first edition was published in Amsterdam in 1594; a second edition was published in 1614 by his son-in-law, Johannes Janssonius.

Translated from Latin, the title of the book is Theatre of the Art of Writing. It is an anthology of handwriting specimens by Solomon Henrix, Jan van de Velde the Elder, Felix van Sambix, Ludovico Curione, M. Martin, Jean de Beauchesne, Jacobus Houthusius, Pieter Goos the Elder, Jacomina Hondius, Peter Bales, and Hondius himself. The book opens with a monumental title page, followed by a four-page typeset instruction in the art of writing. After this a series of 42 copperplate engravings is presented, including specimens in roman, italic, blackletter, Hebrew, and Ancient Greek fonts, in nine different languages. Each specimen is framed by ornate grotesque cartouche. All plates were engraved by Hondius, who included signatures on the pages that show calligraphy invented by other artists.

A facsimile, limited to 300 copies, was published in 1969 by Miland Publishers of the Netherlands. The facsimile was printed by N. Miedema and Co. of Leeuwarden and bound by Van Rijmenam N.V. in The Hague.
