= Wacken =

Wacken may refer to:

- Wacken, Schleswig-Holstein, a municipality in Germany
- Wacken Open Air, heavy metal festival held in Wacken
- Wacken, former name of Wakken, a village in Belgium
