= Jean Surhon =

Franco-Flemish engraver and cartographer

Jean Surhon, also known as Jean de Surhon, Jean Surhonio, Jean Surchon, Johann Surhonio or Ioannes Suthon, (born first half of the 16th century in Mons; died after 1594) was a Franco-Flemish engraver and cartographer.

Two other engravers and cartographers who shared the same name came from his family: Jacques Surhon (d. 1557), his father, and Jacques Surhon (d. 1610), probably his brother. Both worked in Mons. The father was also a silversmith.

From his cartographic work, three maps of areas in what is today north-eastern France and southern Belgium have survived: Namur (1553), Vermandois (1557) and Picardy (1557). The first edition of the atlas Theatrum Orbis Terrarum by Abraham Ortelius — published in Antwerp in 1570 — contained the map of Vermandois. In another edition from 1579, the maps of Namur and Picardy by Ortelius were published.

In some editions - such as a print published by Pieter van den Keere in Amsterdam in 1622 - Jean Surhon is incorrectly named as the author of a map of the Artois region, actually created by father Jacques Surhon in 1554. The maps of Vermandois and Picardy were later used in the atlas Le Theater Francoys, published in Tours by Maurice Bouguereau in 1594
