= Felix van Sambix =

Netherlandish calligrapher

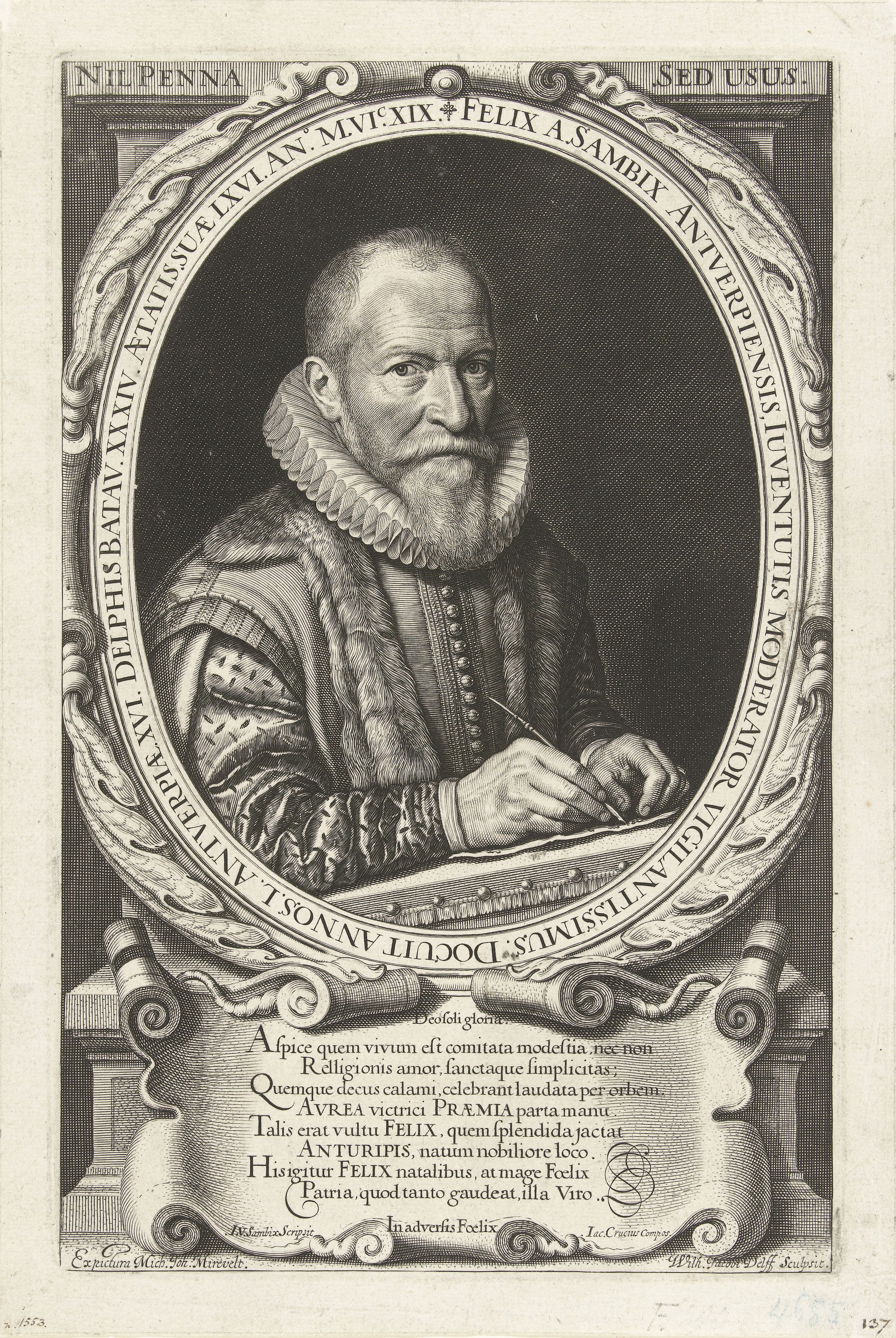
Portrait of Felix van Sambix, 1619, after Van Mierevelt

Felix van Sambix (Antwerp, c. 1553 – Delft, 1642) was a Netherlandish schoolmaster and calligrapher. During his lifetime, he was considered one of the finest writers of the Dutch Republic.

Van Sambix was born in Flemish trading city Antwerp. Being a teacher at a French school, in 1571 he joined the St. Ambrose guild for teachers. His earliest known calligraphic work dates from 1585. Called a ‘kapitaalvoorletterboek’, the publication contained printed capitals and handwritten writing specimens. Like many others, Van Sambix fled the Southern Netherlands after the Fall of Antwerp. He moved to Delft, where he would live and work from 1586 until his death.

On 3 January 1590 Van Sambix participated in the writing competition for the crowned pen (the ‘Plume Couronnée’). Winning the first prize, he surpassed some of the best writing masters of his time, including the young Jan van de Velde the Elder, and established his reputation as a calligrapher.

Most of his surviving work is in manuscript, such as inscriptions in alba amicorum. Printed specimens of his hand were included in Jodocus Hondius’s Theatrum artis scribendi and Maria Strick’s Tooneel der der loflĳcke schrijfpen. An engraved portrait of Van Sambix, based on a painted portrait by Michiel Jansz. van Mierevelt, dated 1619, shows the master writer at the age of 66, still writing.
