= Colette van den Keere =

Dutch cartographer (1568–1629)

- Born: 1568; Ghent, Dutch Republic
- Died: 1629 (aged 60–61); Amsterdam, Dutch Republic
- Burial place: Amsterdam
- Other name: Colette Hondius
- Occupation: Engraver
- Known for: Posthumous portrait of her husband with Mercator
- Spouse: Jodocus Hondius
- Children: 8
- Father: Hendrik van den Keere

Colette van den Keere (Note: Sometimes known as "Colette Hondius" after her marriage) (1568–1629) was a Flemish-Dutch engraver, who was the sister of engraver Pieter van den Keere. She married his master, the cartographer Jodocus Hondius in 1587, and she ran the family business for several years with her sons, after the passing of her husband. She is credited with engraving a posthumous portrait of her husband.

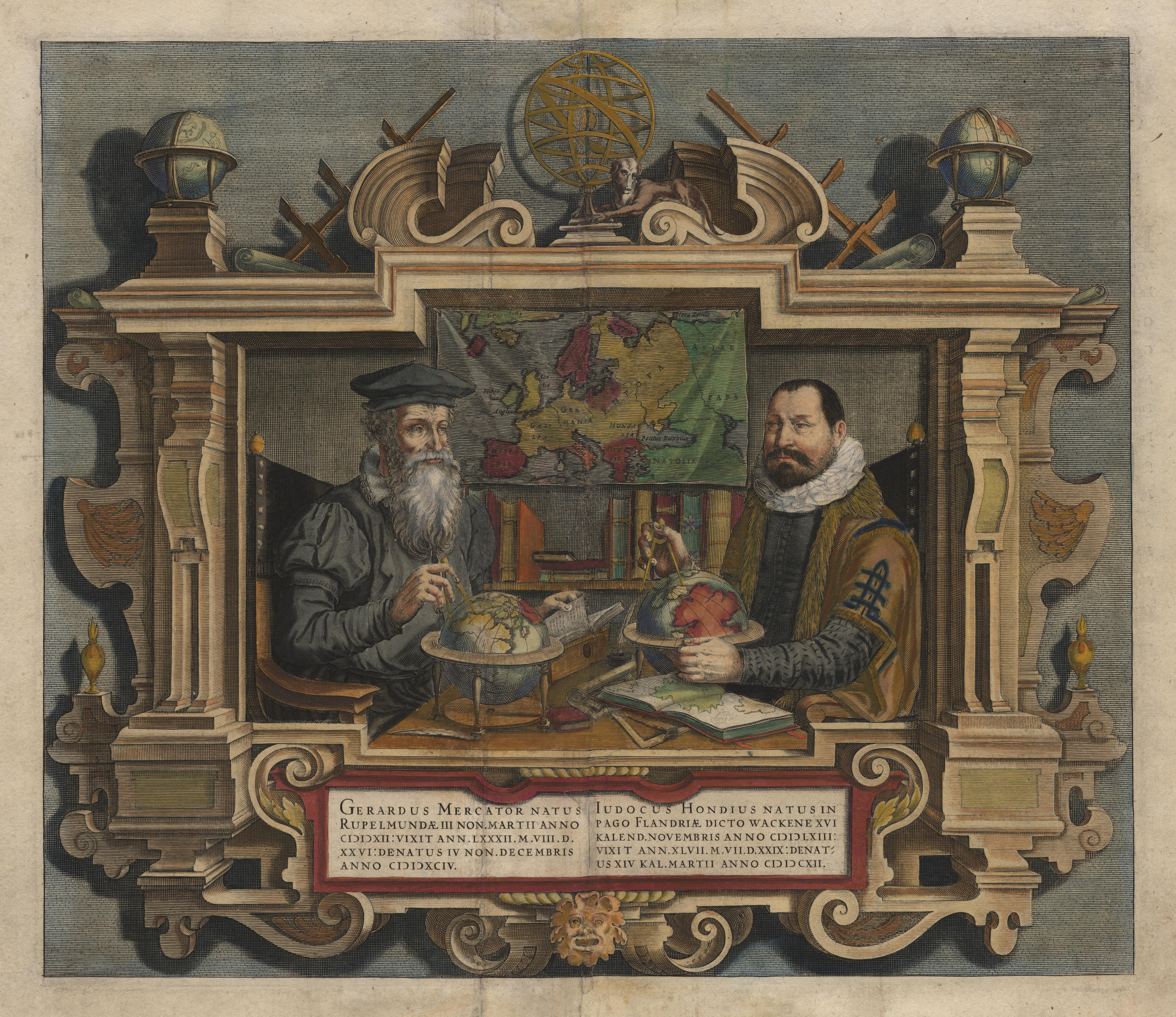
Double portrait of cartographers, Gerardus Mercator and Jodocus Hondius, engraved by Colette van den Keere.

== Biography ==
=== Early life ===
Colette van den Keere was born in Ghent in the Dutch Republic around 1568, the daughter of foundry artist Hendrik van den Keere, (Note: Sometimes spelt as "Henry du Tour".) and Elisabeth van Estelaer. Colette's family, Protestant refugees, temporarily settled in London, England, between 1584 and 1593, after which the family returned to Amsterdam to live permanently.

Colette van den Keere married Jodocus Hondius in the Dutch Church in London on 11 April 1587, and gave birth to eight children including two sons who also became cartographers, Jodocus the Younger and Henricus. Some of her daughters married cartographers, including one who wed the engraver Jan Janssonius, who later joined the family business.

=== Career ===
When the couple returned from London to Amsterdam in 1593, they established an engraving workshop and bookshop that produced maps, globes, and atlases.<ried cartographers, including one who wed the engraver Jan Janssonius, who later joined the family business.

Following the death of her husband in 1612, Van den Keere continued the family engraving and map-publishing business in Amsterdam for several years. During this period the Hondius workshop continued producing maps and atlases before responsibility for the firm passed to their sons Jodocus the Younger and Henricus around 1621.

Van den Keere engraved a double portrait honouring her husband, Jodocus Hondius, about a year after his death in 1612. The engraving depicts Hondius seated with the Flemish cartographer Gerardus Mercator, the two figures facing one another across a table with a globe placed between them and other cartographic instruments. It later appeared as a frontispiece in editions of the Mercator–Hondius atlas published in Amsterdam by Henricus Hondius II in the early seventeenth century.

=== Death ===
Colette van den Keere was buried in Amsterdam on 31 December 1629.
