= Jan Janssonius =

Dutch cartographer and publisher (1588–1664)

- Born: 1588; Arnhem
- Died: 11 July 1664 (aged 75–76); Amsterdam
- Occupation: Cartographer; publisher; printseller; visual artist
- Academic career

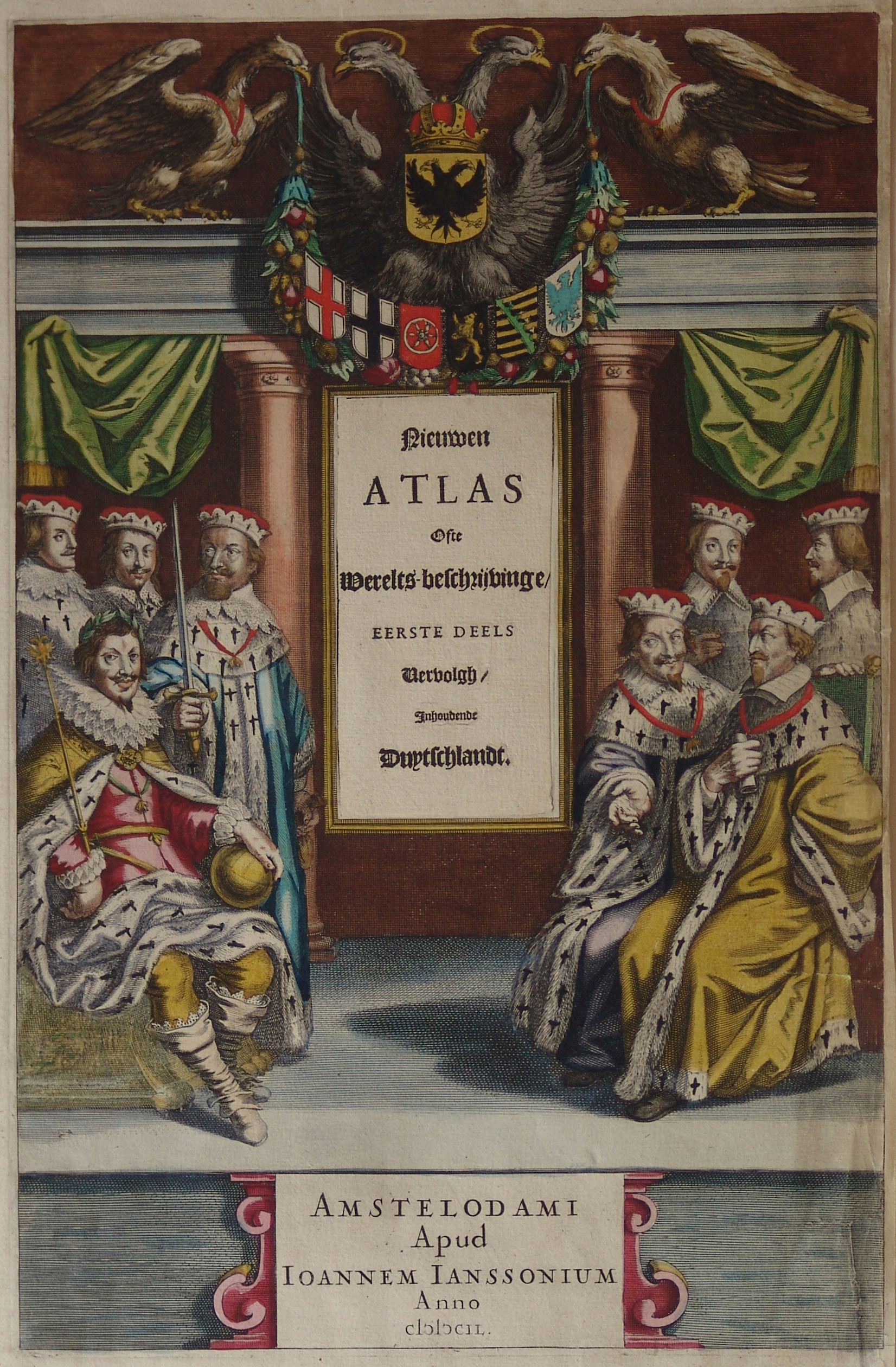
1641 Nieuwen Atlas (New Atlas) by Janssonius

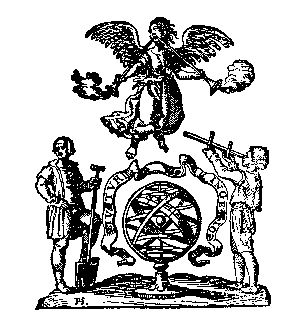
Janssonius' mark (from BEIC)

Johannes "Jan" Janssonius (Note: Johannes "Jan" Janssonius is the Latinised version of the name Johannes/Jan Janszoon, with the short version in Dutch: Jan Jansz.; lit. 'Jan Jansson' in English) (1588, in Arnhem – buried 11 July 1664, Amsterdam), also known in English as Jan Jansson, was a Dutch cartographer and publisher, who lived and worked in Amsterdam in the 17th century. He is regarded as one of the notable figures in the Golden Age of Dutch cartography (c. 1570s–1670s), continuing the work of his famous father-in-law Jodocus Hondius.

== Early life ==
Janssonius was born in Arnhem in 1588, the son of Jan Janszoon the Elder, a publisher and bookseller.

In 1612, at the age of 24, he married Elisabeth de Hondt, the daughter of famous cartographers Jodocus Hondius (Note: Hondius is the Latinised version of the Dutch name de Hondt / d'Hondt) and Colette van den Keere. His wife Elisabeth died in 1627, and he married Elisabeth Carlier two years later in 1629. He worked in the family business of his parents-in-law, along with his brothers-in-law, the cartographers Henricus Hondius II and Jodocus II.

== Career ==
He published his first maps, of France and Italy, in 1616.

By about 1623, Janssonius had begun acquiring bookstores in several European cities, including Frankfurt am Main, Danzig, Stockholm, Copenhagen, Berlin, Königsberg, Geneva, and Lyon. These bookshops operated alongside his publishing activities and provided outlets for the distribution of his maps and atlases.

From about 1630 to 1638 he was in partnership with his brother-in-law Henricus Hondius II, and together they issued new editions of the Mercator–Hondius atlases under the name Mercator/Hondius/Janssonius.

=== Atlas publications ===
Under Janssonius, the Hondius atlas project was steadily expanded. The work developed into a large multi-volume atlas that later became known as Atlas Maior. By 1660, it consisted of eleven volumes and included contributions from about one hundred credited authors and engravers.

Additional volumes were issued as the series grew. These included works devoted to maritime geography, the ancient world, and collections of city views and plans. One of these was the Atlas Maritimus, a maritime atlas published in 1657. Janssonius also issued an extensive atlas of city plans, often referred to as a Townatlas.

The final volume of the series was a celestial atlas created by the German-Dutch cartographer Andreas Cellarius. Published in 1660, it formed the eleventh volume of Atlas Maior.

== Death ==
Janssonius died in 1664. After his death the publishing business continued through his heirs and associates, including his son-in-law Johannes van Waesbergen.

== Selected works ==
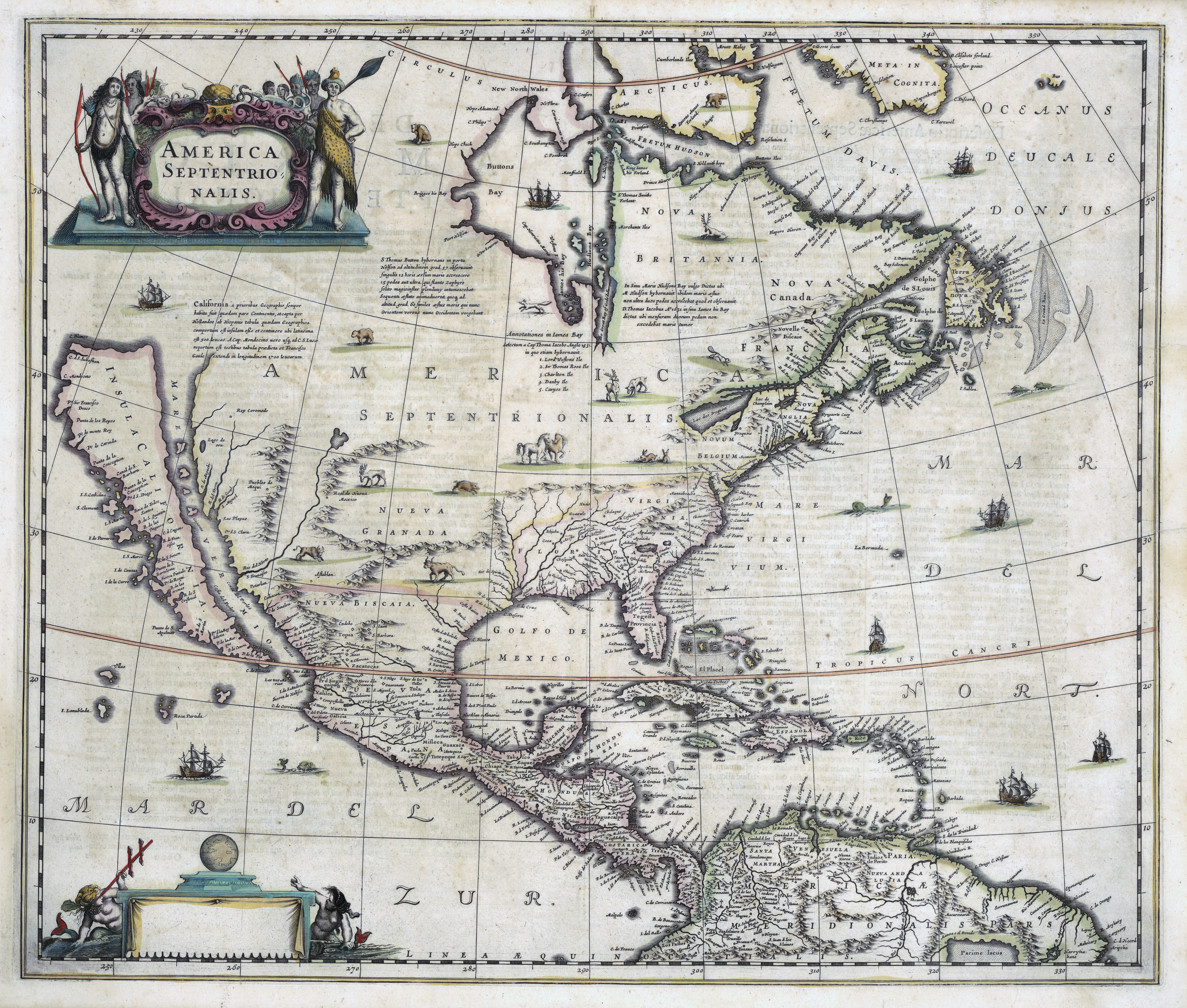
America Septentrionalis, 1636 (meaning septentrional or North America, referring to the seven stars of the Big Dipper or Plough)

- Sueciæ, Norvegiæ et Daniæ Nova Tabula, Amsterdam c. 1645.
- Tabula exactissima Regnorum Sueciæ et Norvegiæ (1636), which replaced Henricus Hondius II 1613
- Gerardus Mercator; Jodocus Hondius I; Jan Janssonius; Pieter van den Keere; Abraham Goos (1628). Atlas minor: Gerardi Mercatoris a I. Hondio plurimis aeneis tabulis auctus et illustratus: denuo recognitio, additisque novis delineationibus emendatus (in Latin). Amsterdam: Jan Janssonius. LCCN 2017585947. OCLC 1039979074. Wikidata Q130391946.
- Episcopatum Stavangriensis, Bergensis et Asloiensis Amsterdam 1636–1642. The first map to show the Oslo Fjord by name. This map shows Southern Norway with the Stavanger bishopric and the adjoining area of the Bergen and Oslo bishoprics.

== See also ==
- List of cartographers
- History of cartography
- Willem Blaeu

== Sources ==
- Peter van der Krogt (ed.): Koeman's atlantes Neerlandici, Vol. 1: The folio atlases published by Gerard Mercator, Jodocus Hondius, Henricus Hondius, Johannes Janssonius and their successors, ’t Goy-Houten 1997, ISBN 90-6194-268-3
