= Henricus Hondius II =

Dutch cartographer, engraver, and publisher (1597–1651)

- Born: 1597; Amsterdam
- Died: 16 August 1651 (aged 53–54); Amsterdam
- Occupation: Cartographer; publisher; printer; engraver
- Parent(s): Jodocus Hondius; Colette van den Keere
- Relatives: Jodocus Hondius II
- Academic career

Henricus Hondius II (Note: The Latinised version of the Dutch name Hendrik de Hondt / d'Hondt) (1597 – 16 August 1651) was a Dutch engraver, cartographer, and publisher.

== Life ==
He was born in Amsterdam, the son of the famous cartographers Jodocus Hondius and Colette van den Keere, who had started a map-making business in the city. Henricus obtained the original plates of the Mercator 1569 world map, and he published a 1606 version of it. After his father died in 1612, Henricus co-ran the business with his mother, brother Jodocus II, and brother-in-law Jan Janssonius. In 1621 opened his own company in Amsterdam. The first time his name was mentioned in an atlas was in 1623 when he published the fifth edition of the Mercator–Hondius atlas.

He died in Amsterdam.

He came from a different family from Hendrik Hondius I; there were two families engaged in very similar activities at the same time.

== Works ==
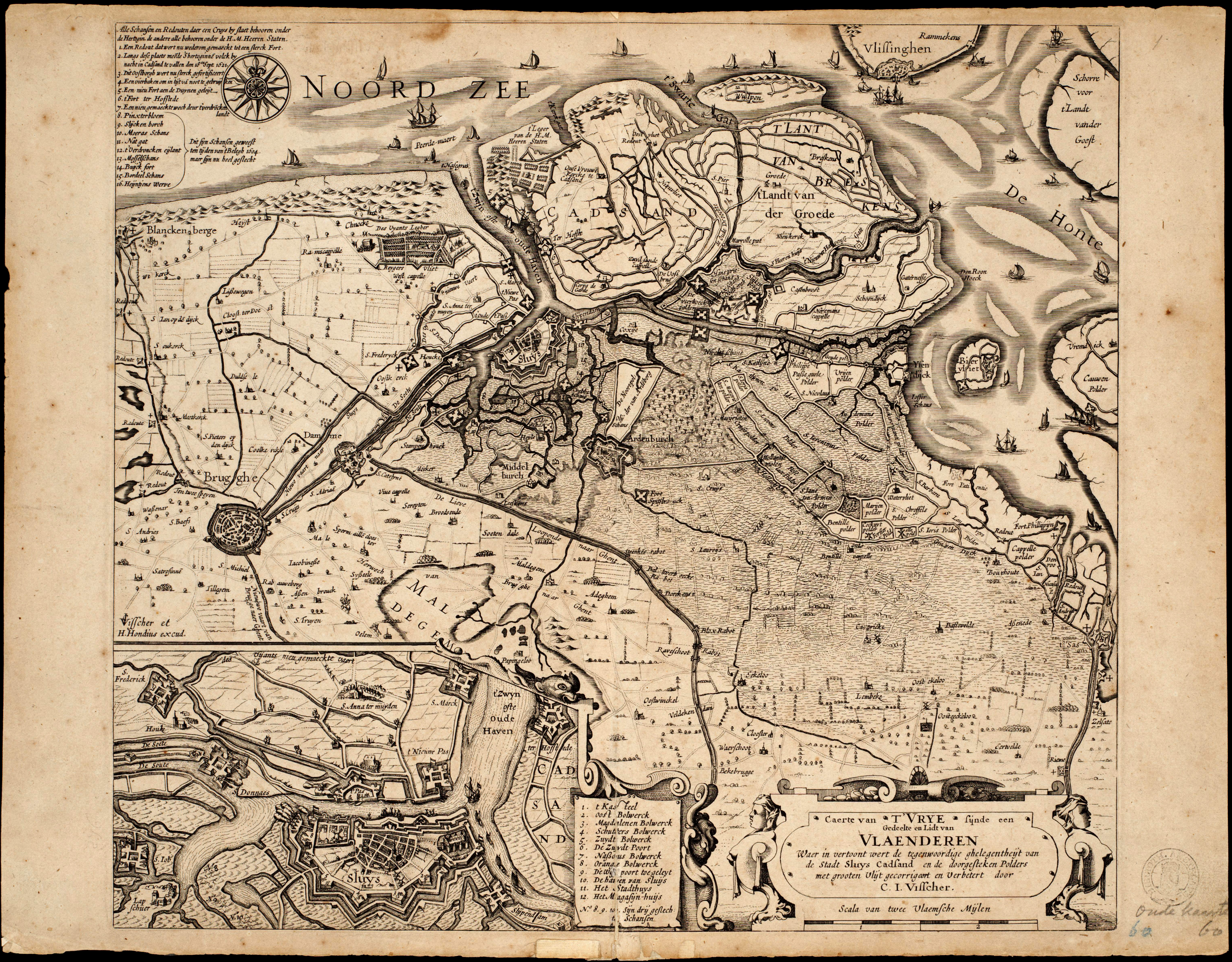
1622 Oostelijk Zeeuws Vlaanderen

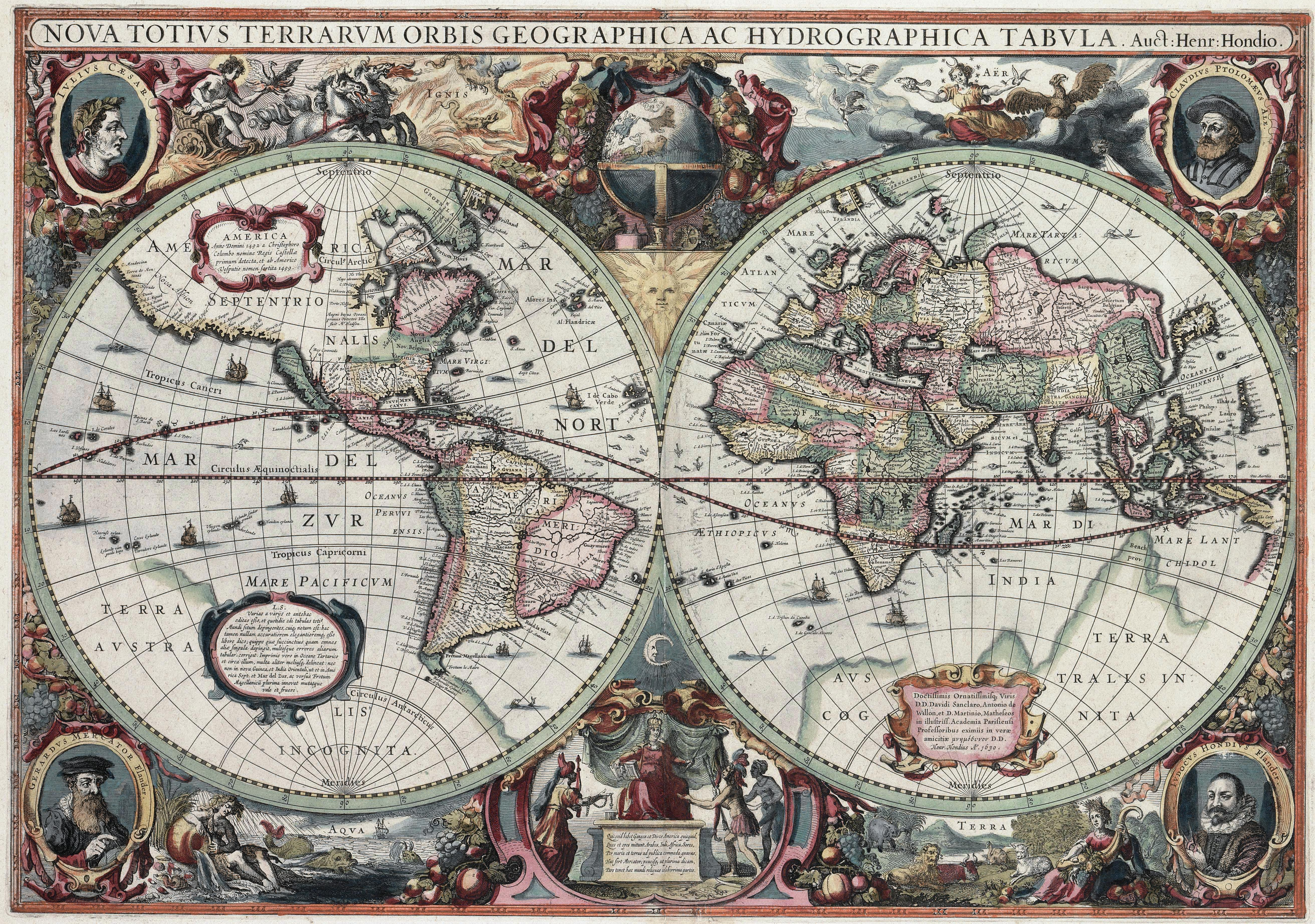
1630 World Map, Nova Totius Terrarum Orbis Geographica ac Hydrographica Tabula

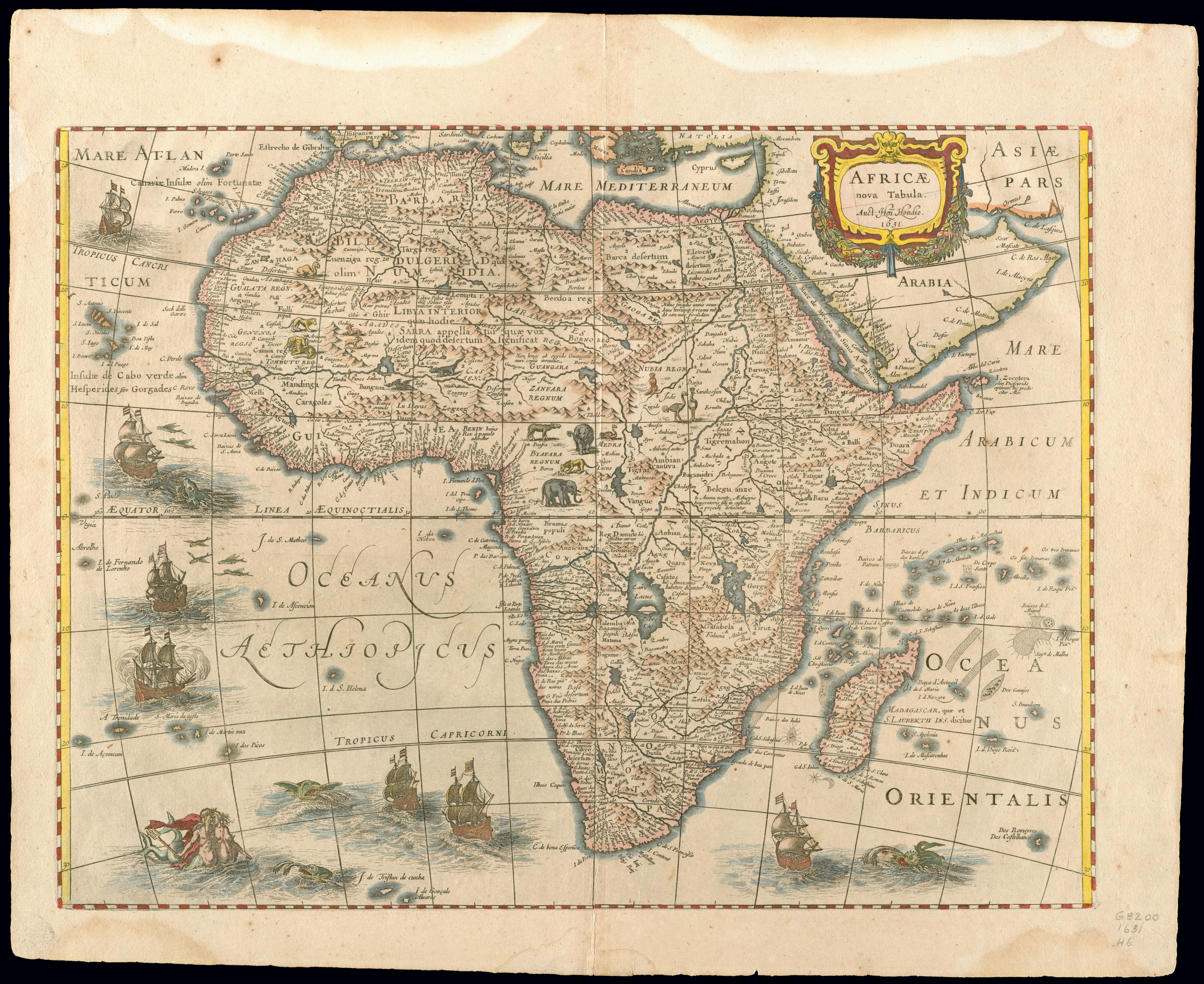
1631 Africa

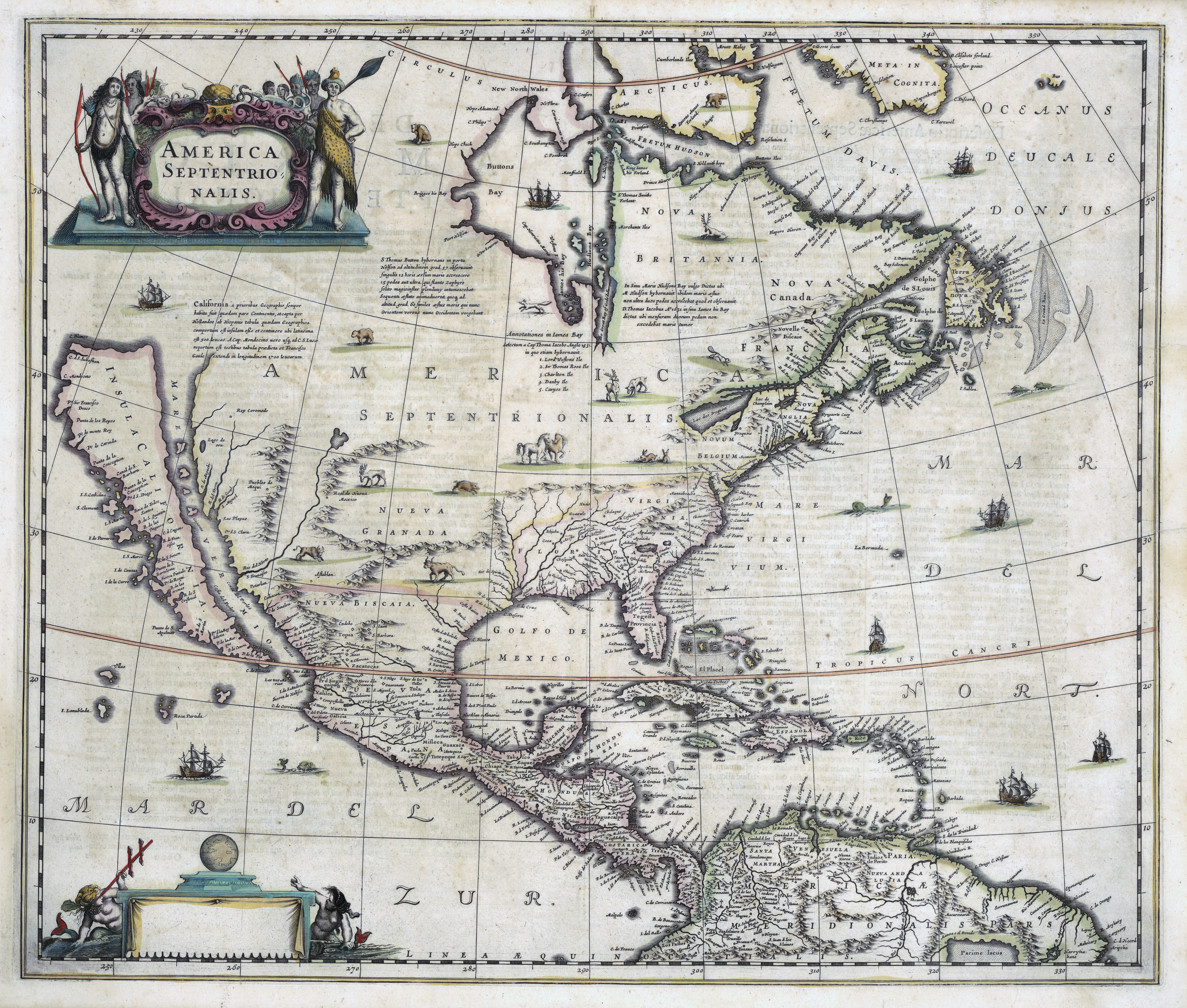
1636 North America

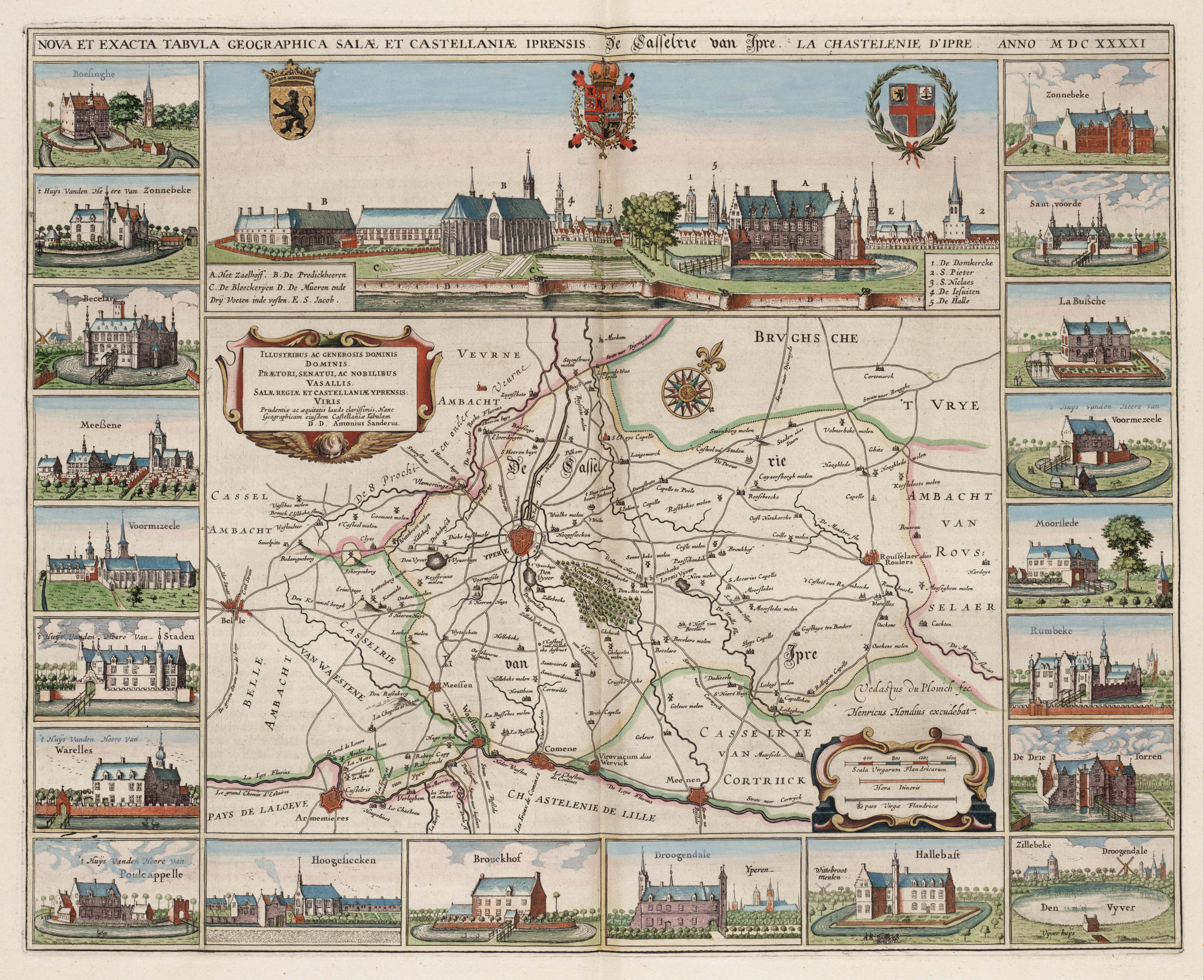
1641 Nova et .. Iprensis

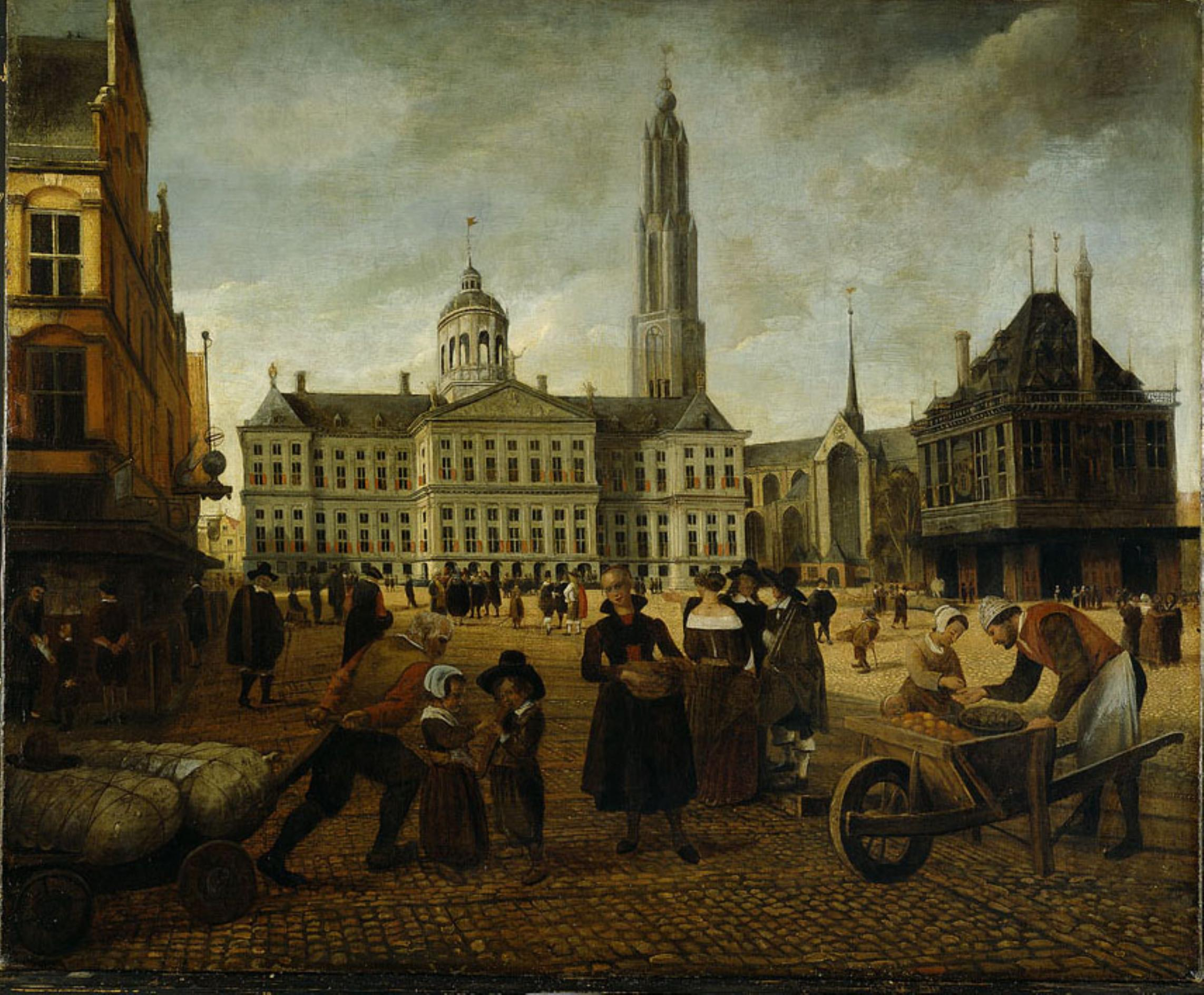
The bookshop: Wakkere Hond

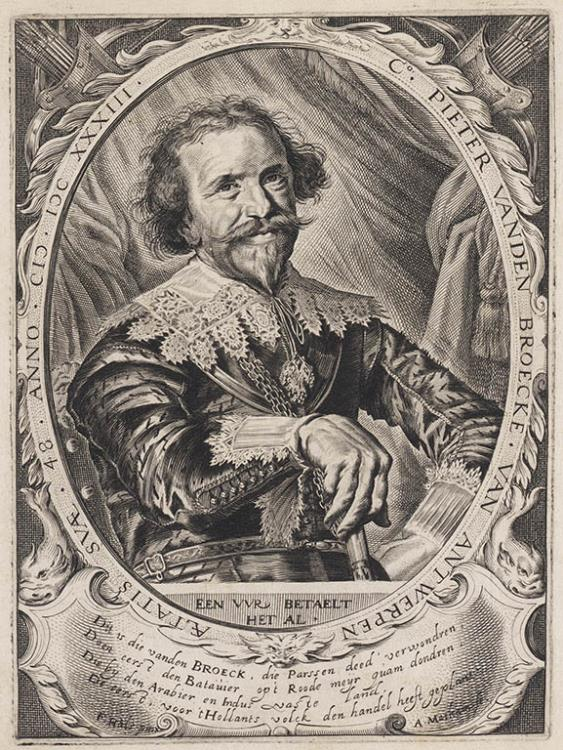
Pieter van den Broecke.

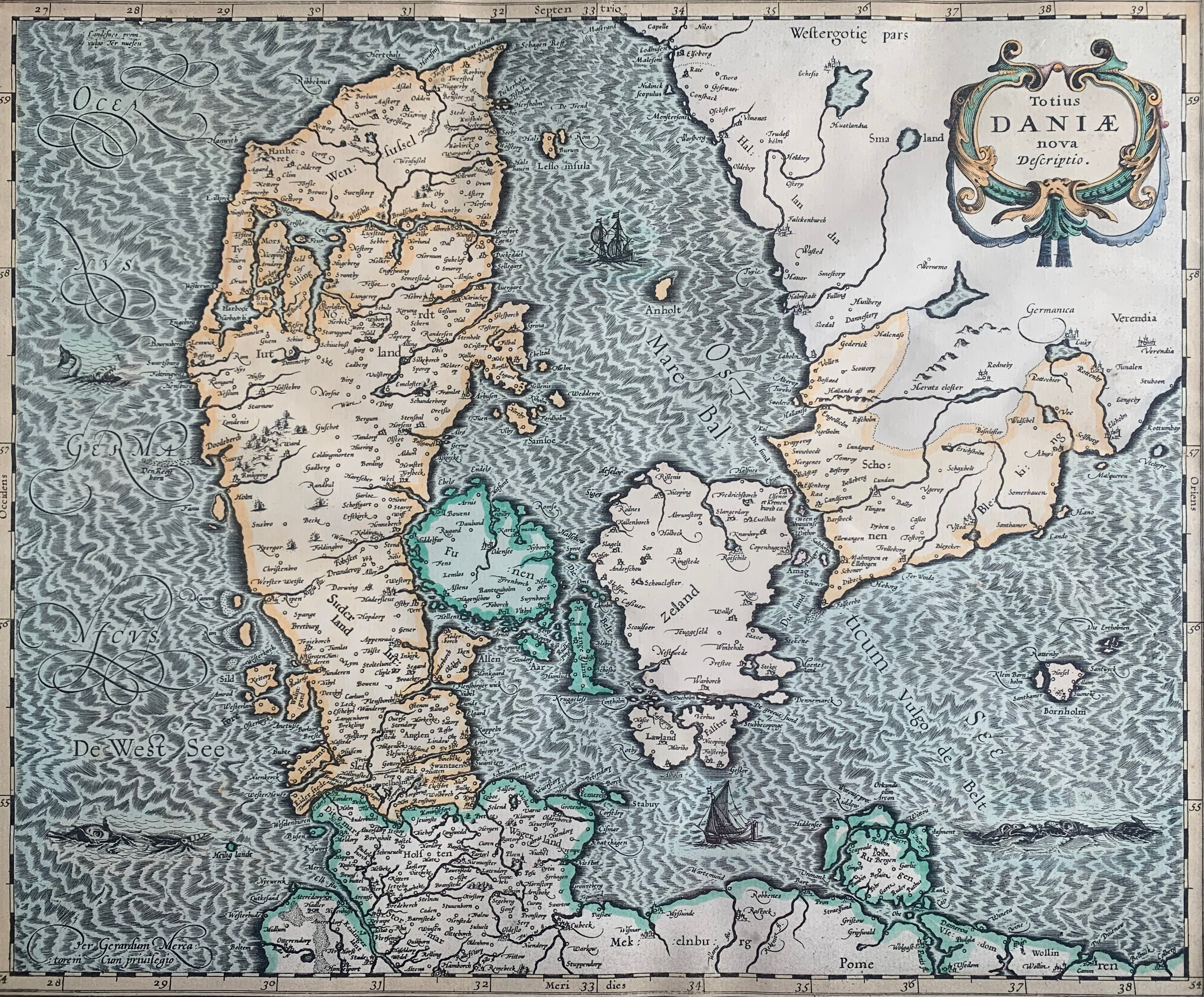
Denmark 17th-century
