= Jean de la Chambre =

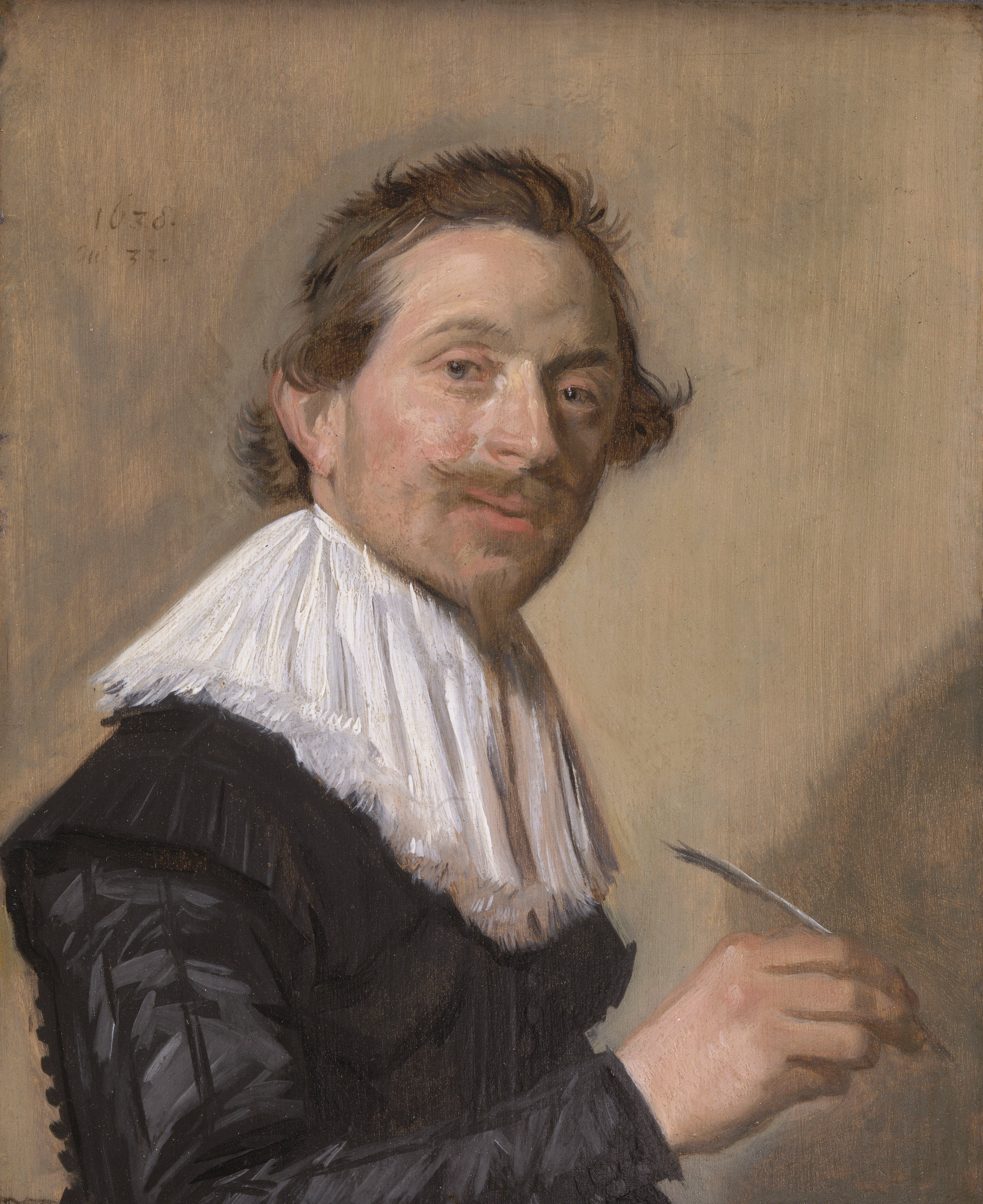
Portrait of Jean de la Chambre in 1638, holding his quill pen, by Frans Hals

Jean de la Chambre (1605, Haarlem – 1668, Haarlem) was an engraver and calligrapher in the Dutch Golden Age, best known today for his portrait by Frans Hals, which is in the collection of the National Gallery in London.

== Biography ==
His parents were originally from Cambrai and travelled via Antwerp north to escape the troubles of the Fall of Antwerp, settling in Haarlem where Jean was later born. Like his contemporary Nicolaes Boddingius, he was probably a student of the Haarlem schoolmasters Peter Heyns, Jan van de Velde the Elder or Jacob van der Schuere. According to the RKD, he was a school master in Haarlem and the father of Jean de la Chambre the younger. He is known for ornamental works. He had a brother, Pieter or Pierre de la Chambre, who was schoolmaster in Beverwijk.

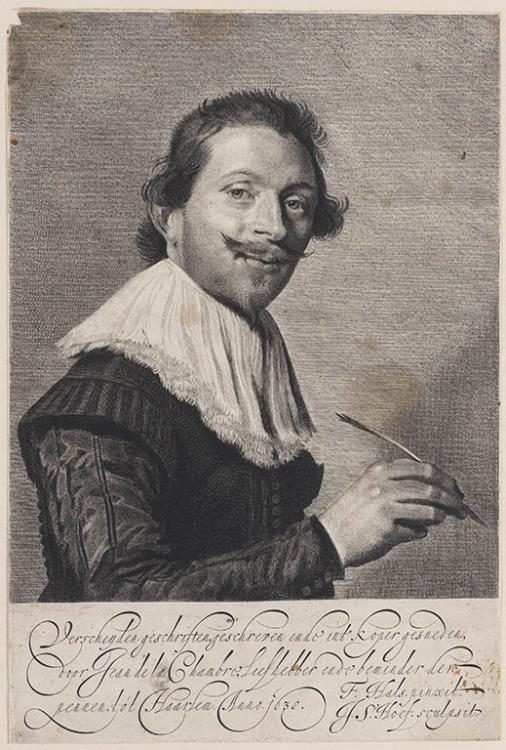
Engraving of Hals's portrait of Jean de la Chambre, by Jonas Suyderhoef

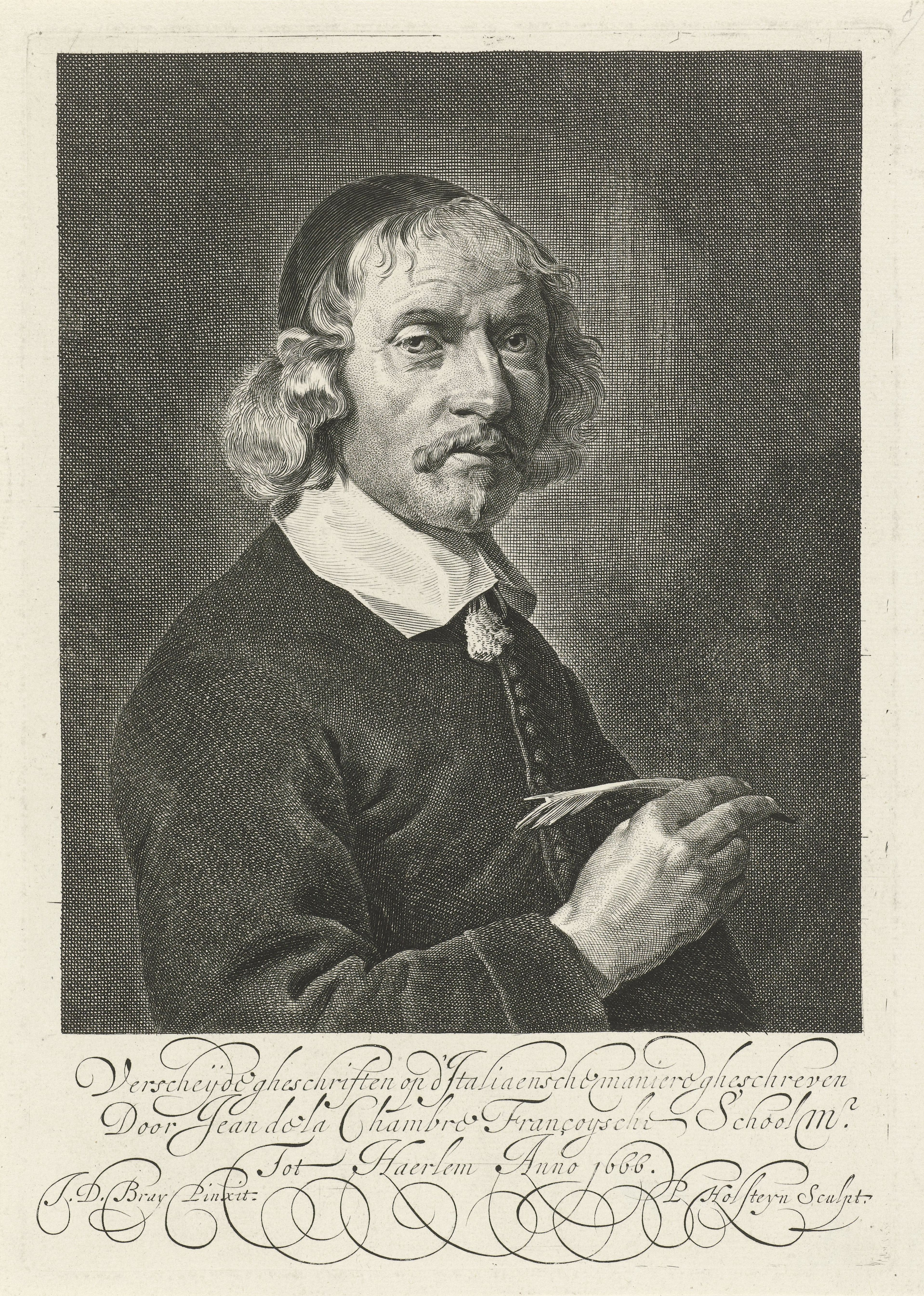
Engraving of Jan de Bray's portrait of Jean de la Chambre at a later age, 1666, by Pieter Holsteyn II

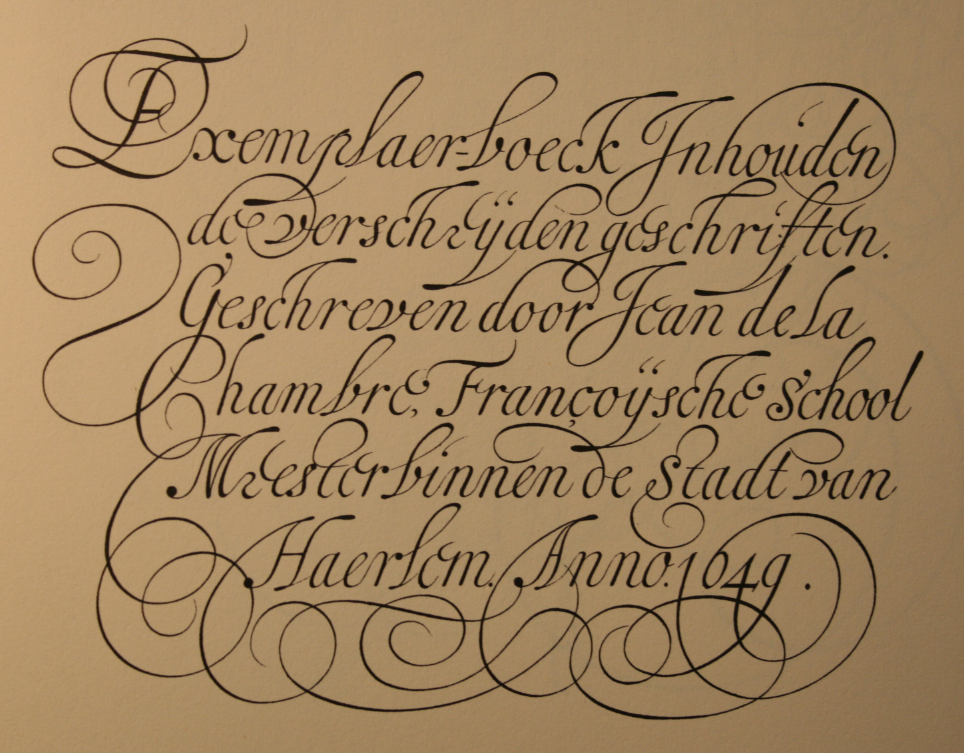
Writing example dated 1649 by "the French schoolmaster in Haarlem" Jean de la Chambre

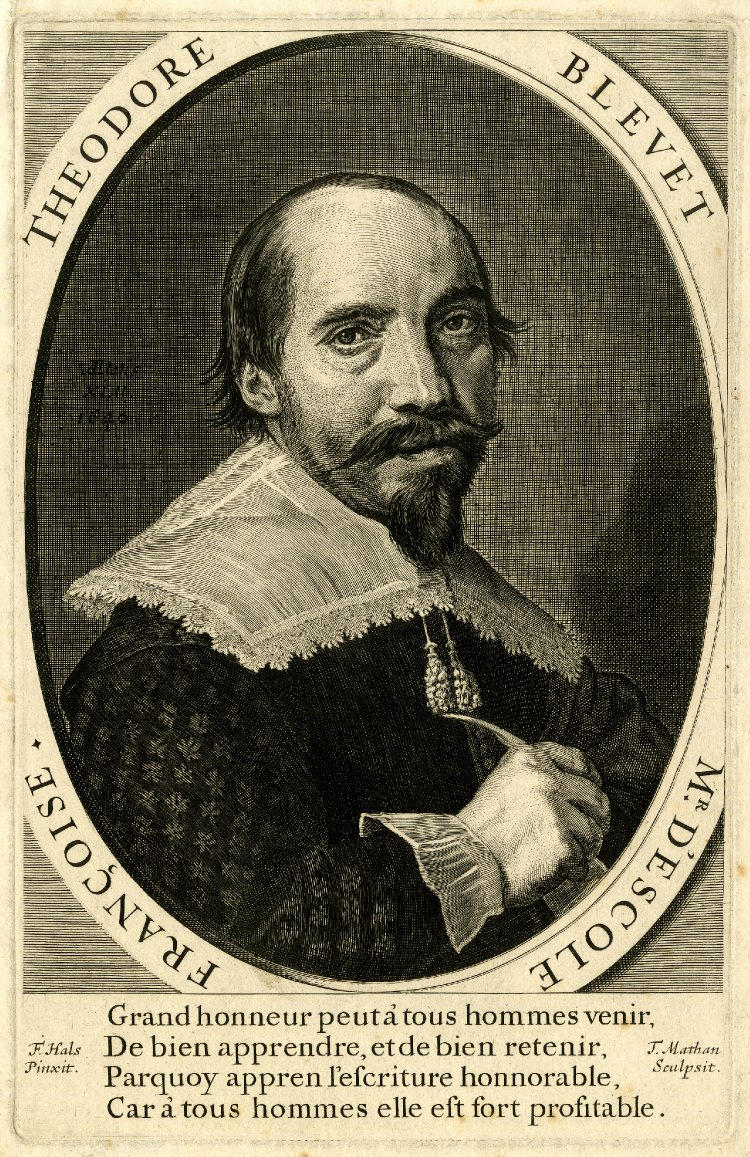
Engraving of Hals's portrait of Theodore Blevet, colleague of Pierre de la Chambre, by Theodor Matham
