= Modest Huys =

Flemish impressionist and luminist painter

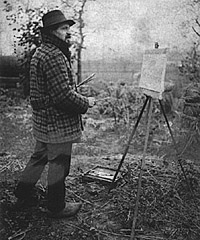
Modest Huys (1917)

Modest Huys (25 October 1874 in Zulte – 30 January 1932 in Zulte) was a Flemish impressionist and luminist painter, who is regarded as one of the greatest Belgian painters of the 20th century.

== Personal life ==
From a young age, he worked in his father's painting and decorating business and later studied at the "Gentse Nijverheidschool" (Ghent Industrial School). In 1891 or 1892, he came into contact with Emile Claus, who encouraged his artistic inclinations. In 1900, he enrolled at the Royal Academy of Fine Arts (Antwerp), where his teachers were Eugène Joors and Frans Van Leemputten (1850-1914), but he never completed his studies. It was about this time that he became lifelong friends with the author Stijn Streuvels. In 1909, he married and settled near Waregem.

== Career ==
In 1902, he debuted at the Sint-Lucasgilde in Kortrijk and began to exhibit more widely. He spent time in Meetjesland, painting landscapes. From 1905, he participated in the exhibitions of Vie et Lumière, a luminist group, along with Claus, James Ensor and Jenny Montigny.

At the outbreak of World War I, he fled to the Netherlands, although he returned in 1915 and moved about as the war dictated. His home and studio were destroyed in 1918 and he ended up living with a forester near Brakel. After the armistice, he painted scenes of the devastation at the front, then settled in Wakken the following year.

He again began to exhibit extensively, including shows at the Paris Salon and the Carnegie Institute in Pittsburgh. During this period, his colors became darker and the contrasts harsher, approaching expressionism. In 1926, he built his ideal home-studio, the "Zonnehuys" (Sun House), in Zulte. Several taverns in the area claim to have frescoes that he painted. A square in Olsene (a district of Zulte) was named after him in 1999.

== Gallery ==
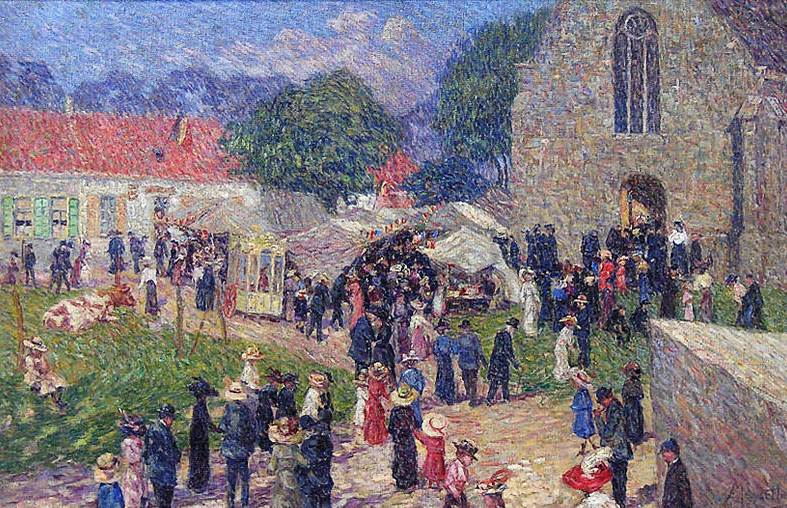
Fairground in Kerselaere (c.1912)

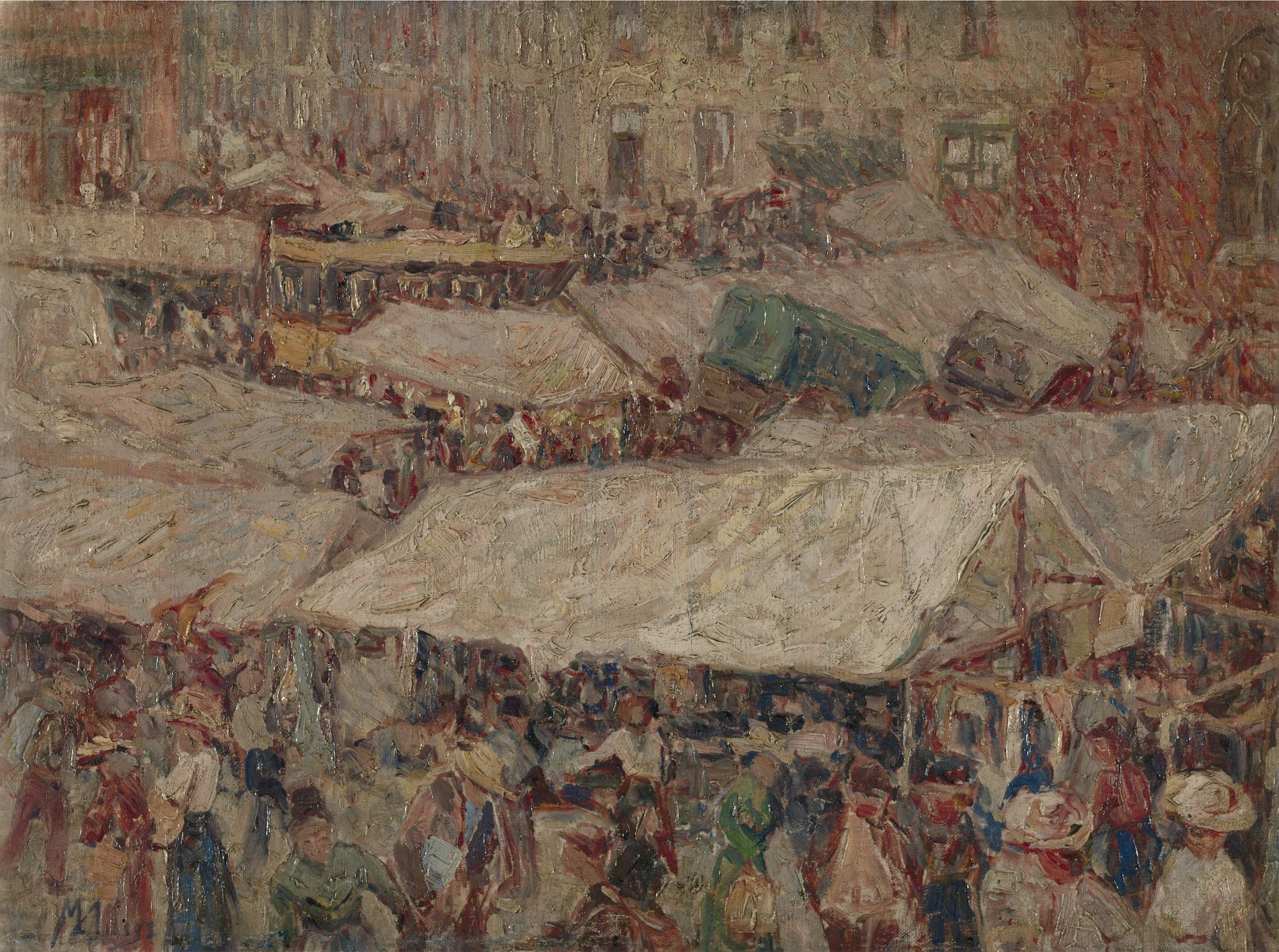
Market in Waregem

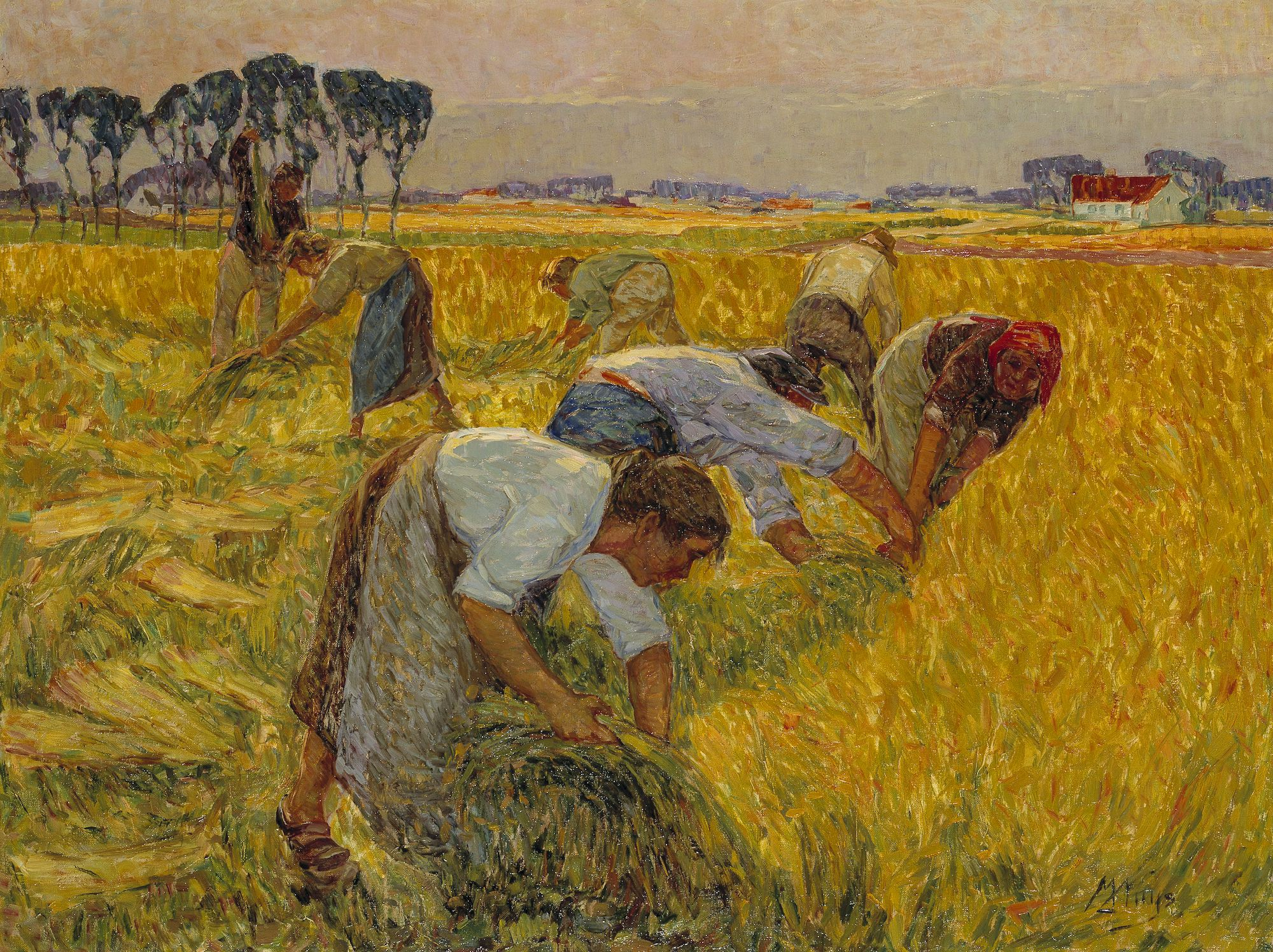
Flax harvest Museum van Deinze en de Leiestreek

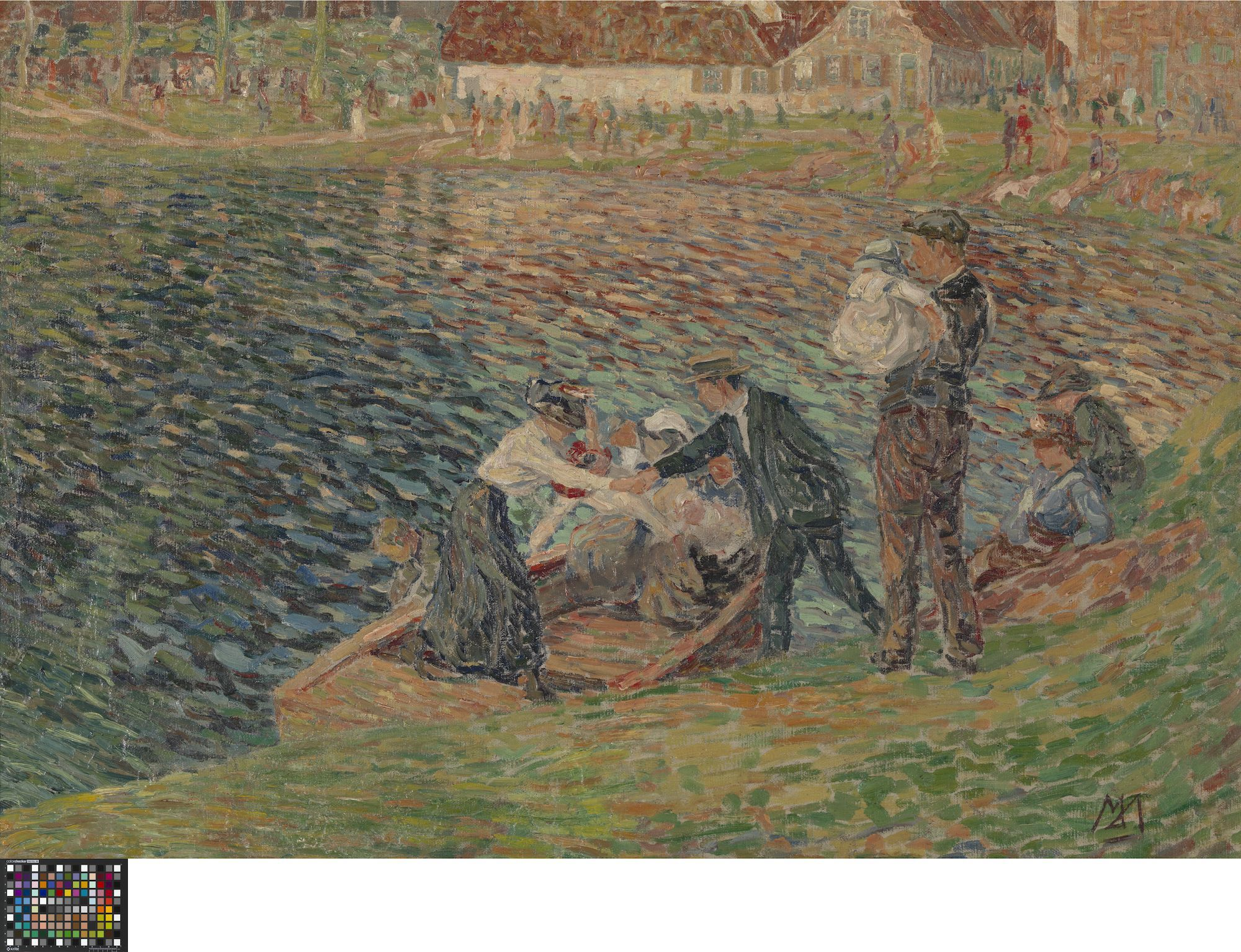
Transfer Museum van Deinze en de Leiestreek

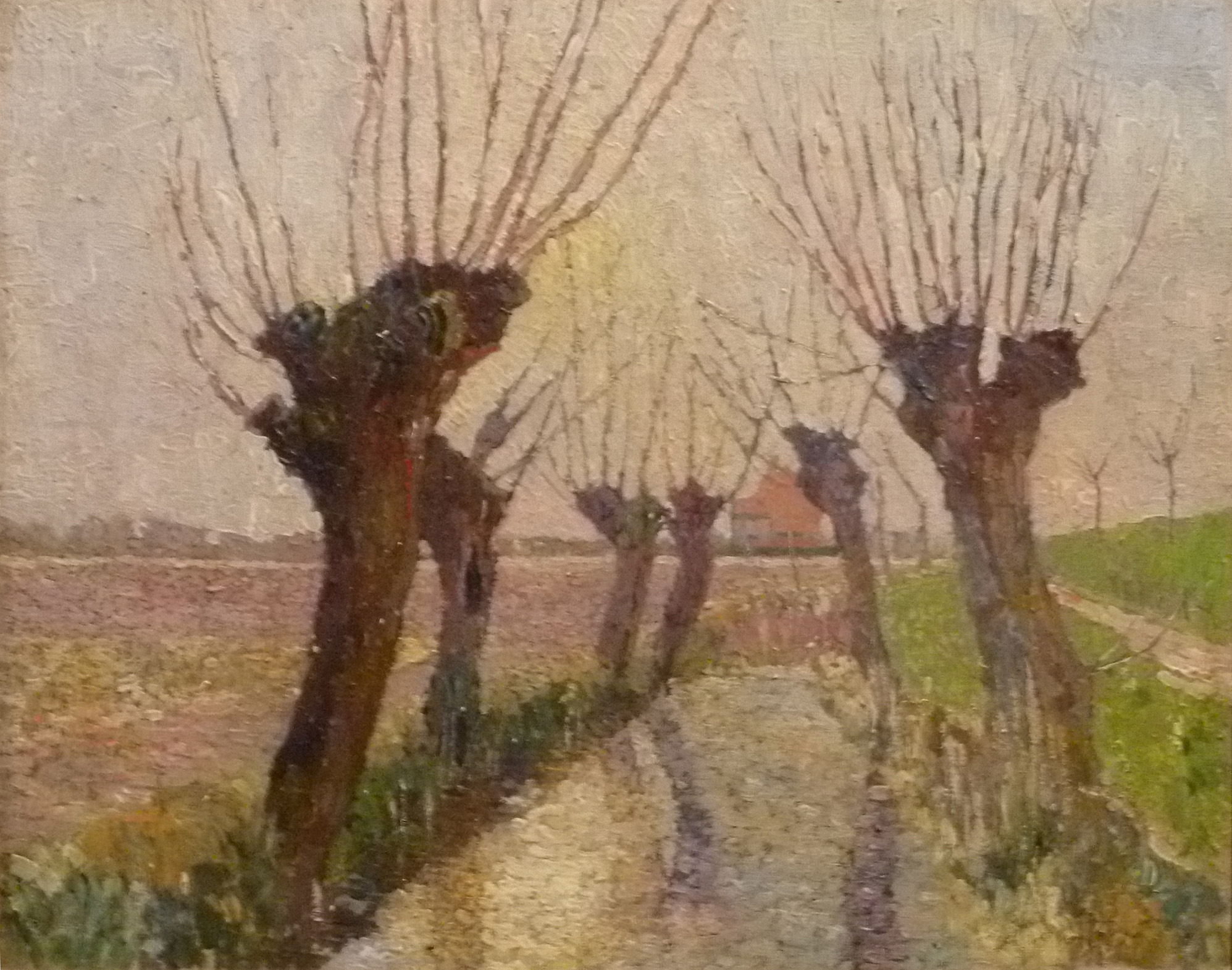
The Willows (date unknown)
