= Copybook =

Copybook may refer to:

- Copybook (calligraphy), a book containing examples of calligraphic script
- Copybook (comics), a self-published and self-made work by fans or original fiction published using a copy machine
- Copybook (education), a book used in education that contains examples of handwriting and blank space for learners to imitate
- Copybooks, files that are mentioned in include directives in many programming languages
