= Jan van de Velde the Elder =

Dutch calligrapher (1568–1623)

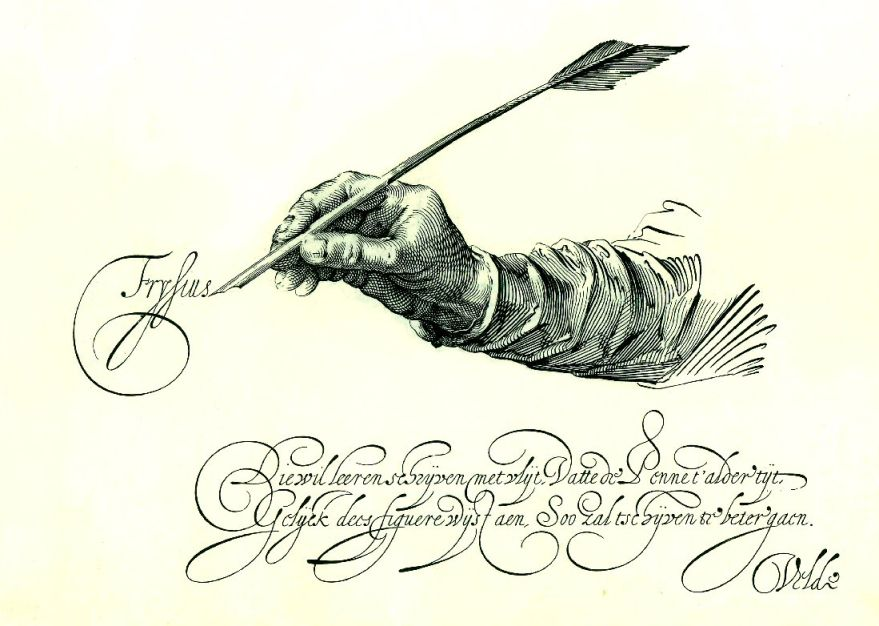
Calligraphy by Jan Van De Velde from the Spieghel der schrijfkonste

Jan van de Velde the Elder (1568, Antwerp – 1623, Haarlem), was a Dutch calligrapher, writing teacher, and engraver. He was the father of the engraver Jan van de Velde.

== Biography ==
According to the RKD he was possibly the pupil of Felix van Sambix. He married Mayken van Bracht from Turnhout, sister-in-law of the publisher Jan van Waesberghe, in 1592 in Rotterdam and opened a French school there. Their son, Jan van de Velde, became a painter. He published his calligraphy in the Spieghel der Schrijfkonste in 1605. In 1620 moved to Haarlem, where he was possibly the teacher of the Haarlem calligraphers Jean de la Chambre or Nicolaes Bodding van Laer.
