= Jodocus Hondius =

Flemish and Dutch engraver and cartographer (1563–1612)

- Joost de Hondt
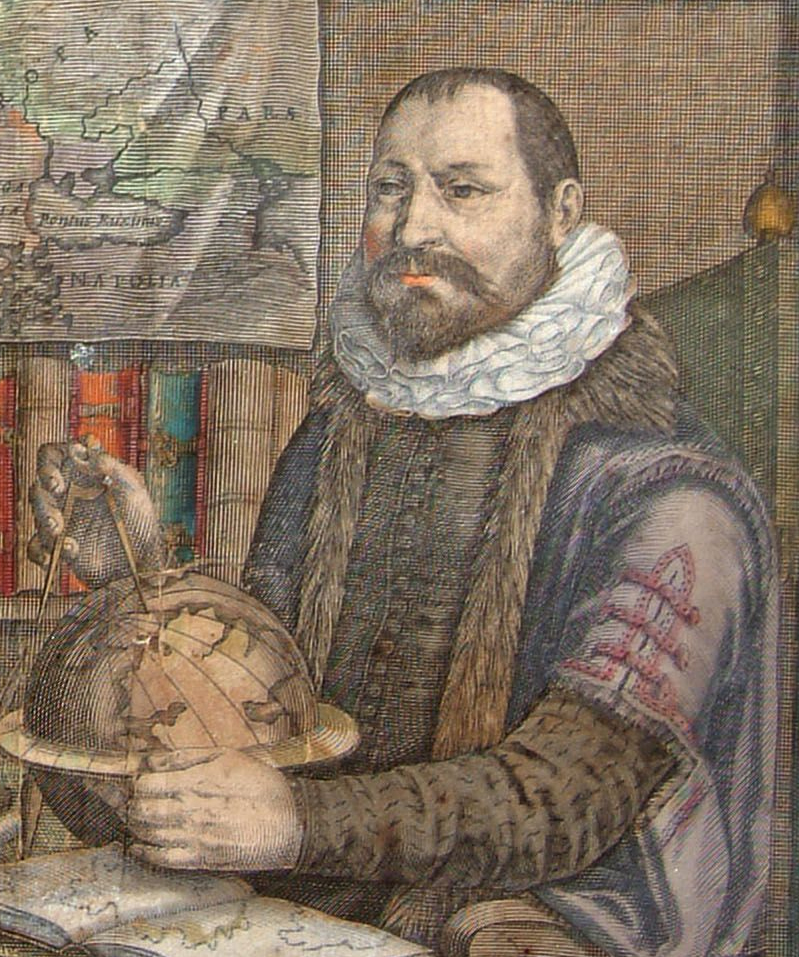
- Jodocus Hondius on a 1619 engraving by Colette van den Keere
- Born: 17 October 1563; Wakken, County of Flanders
- Died: 12 February 1612 (aged 48); Amsterdam, Dutch Republic
- Citizenship: Low Countries
- Spouse: Colette van den Keere
- Partner: Pieter van den Keere (brother-in-law)
- Children: Jodocus II; Henricus; Elizabeth (wife of Jan Janssonius)
- Scientific career
- Fields: Cartography

Jodocus Hondius (Latinised version of his Dutch name: Joost de Hondt) (17 October 1563 – 12 February 1612) was a Flemish engraver and cartographer. He is sometimes called Jodocus Hondius the Elder to distinguish him from his son Jodocus Hondius II. Hondius is best known for his early maps of the New World and Europe, for re-establishing the reputation of the work of Gerardus Mercator, and for his portraits of Francis Drake. He inherited and republished the plates of Mercator, thus reviving his legacy, also making sure to include independent revisions to his work. One of the notable figures in the Golden Age of Dutch cartography (c. 1570s–1670s), he helped establish Amsterdam as the centre of cartography in Europe in the 17th century.

== Biography ==
=== Early life and training ===
Jodocus Hondius was born in Wakken in the County of Flanders (now Belgium), the son of Olivier de Hondt and Petronella van Havertuyn.

He was raised in Ghent and trained there as an engraver, developing the drawing skills that supported his later work. By the early 1580s he was working as an engraver and also producing scientific instruments and globes.

In 1584 he left Flanders for London with his sister Jacomina to escape religious difficulties. In 1587 in the Dutch Church of London, he married cartographer Colette van den Keere, the daughter of the engraver Hendrik van den Keere. He also worked with her brother Pieter van den Keere, a mapmaker and engraver.

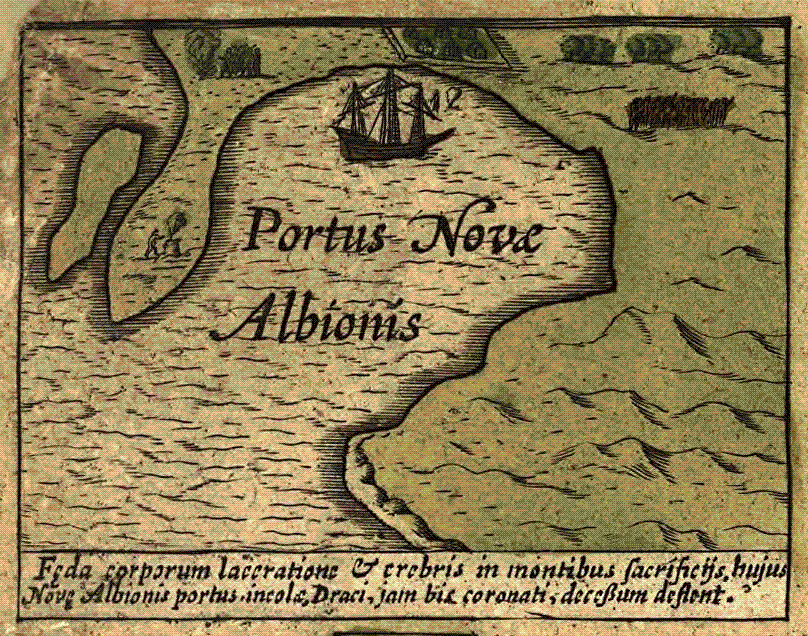
Hondius map of the bay of New Albion on the Pacific coast of North America

=== Work in England ===
While in England, Hondius was instrumental in publicising the work of Francis Drake, who had made a circumnavigation of the world in the late 1570s. In particular, in 1589 Hondius produced a now famous map of the bay of New Albion at Drake's Cove, where Drake briefly established a settlement on the west coast of North America.

Hondius is also thought to be the artist of several well-known portraits of Drake that are now in the National Portrait Gallery in London. Also Hondius had engraved charts in the Mariners Mirrour (1588) and the gores for the first English globes, those of Emery Molyneux completed in 1592.

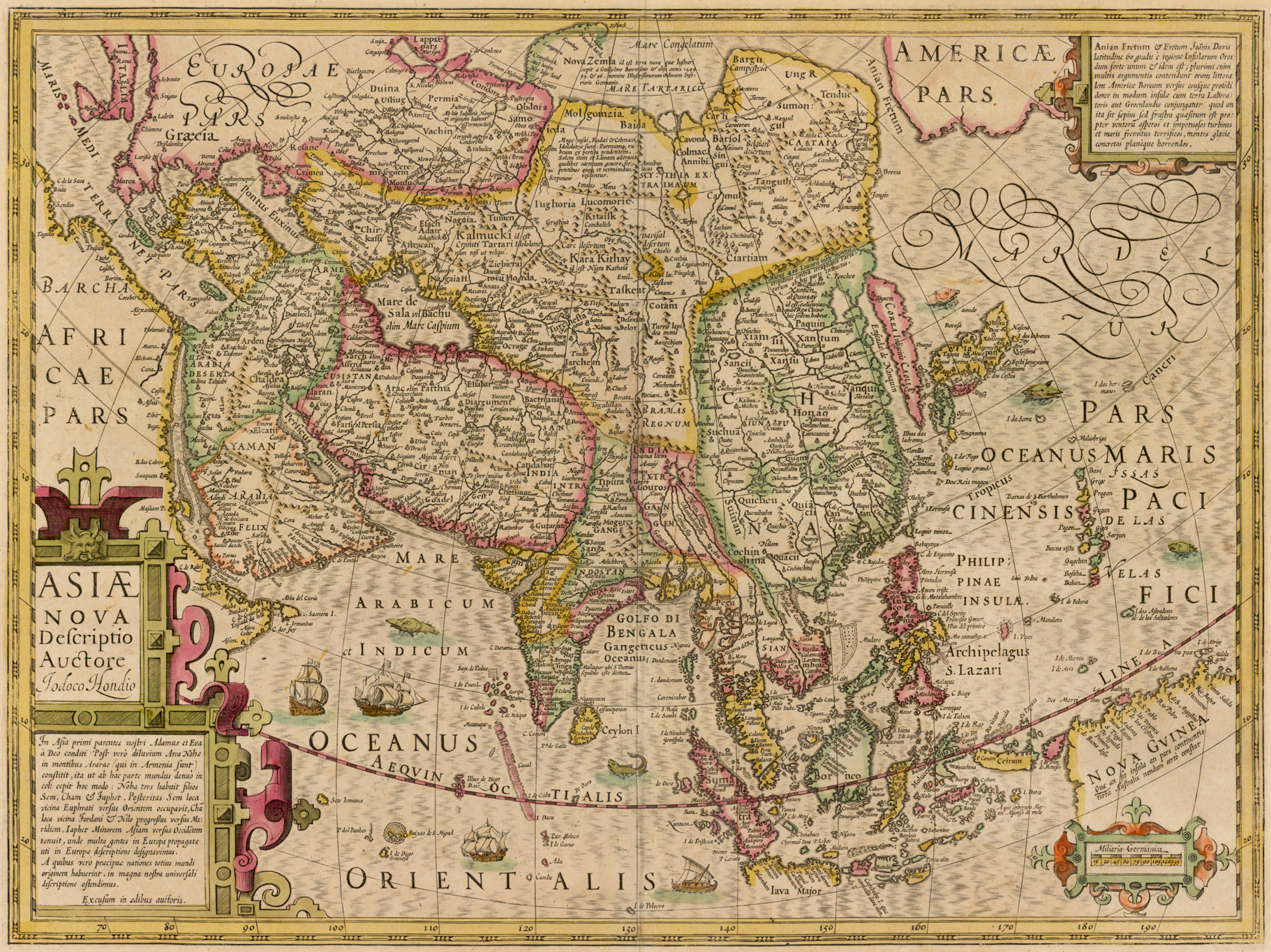
Hondius's (or his predecessors') use of multiple sources can be illustrated by this map of Asia, which shows Beijing three times: twice as "Khanbaliq" (Combalich in the land of 'Kitaisk' on the Ob River, and Cambalu, in 'Cataia'), and once as "Paquin", in the prefecture of Xuntien

=== Mercator/Hondius series ===
In 1604 Hondius acquired the copperplates of Gerardus Mercator's Atlas from Mercator's heirs and prepared a revised edition in Amsterdam. The new atlas, published in 1606, retained the 107 maps that had appeared in Mercator's 1595 edition but added 37 newly engraved maps produced by Hondius and other cartographers. Several of these new maps were engraved by Hondius himself.

Through these additions Hondius expanded the geographic scope of the work. The atlas included new regional maps of Africa, Asia, and the Americas, as well as additional maps of European regions. Hondius also introduced four new continent maps while retaining the earlier continent maps from Mercator's atlas.

Despite these revisions Hondius continued to credit Mercator as the author of the atlas while identifying himself as its publisher. The atlas combined Mercator's earlier plates with newly engraved maps produced in Hondius's Amsterdam workshop.

Hondius's new edition of Mercator's work was a great success, selling out after a year. Hondius later published a second edition, as well as a pocket version Atlas Minor. The maps have since become known as the "Mercator/Hondius series".

After Hondius's death in 1612 the atlas continued to be published by his sons and later in partnership with his son-in-law Jan Janssonius.

=== Later publications and cartographic innovations ===
In the French edition of the Atlas Minor we find one of the first instances of a thematic map using map symbols. This is a map entitled Designatio orbis christiani (1607) showing the dispersion of major religions.

Hondius used copper plates to print John Speed's atlas The Theatre of the Empire of Great Britaine, which was published in 1611/2.

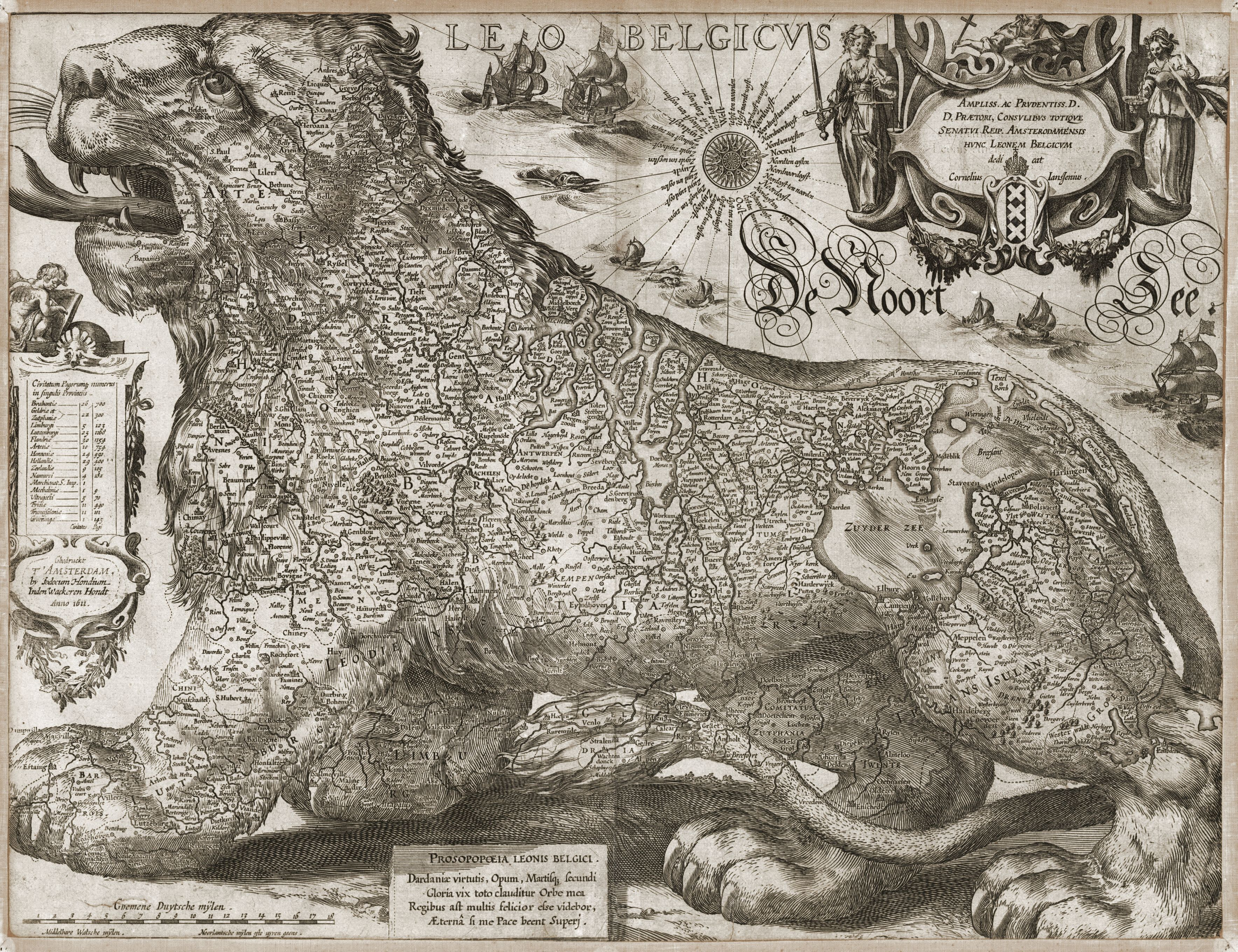
Leo Belgicus (1611).

=== End of life and legacy ===
Hondius died, aged 48 (1612), in Amsterdam. After his death, his publishing work in Amsterdam was continued by his widow, two sons, Jodocus II and Henricus, and son-in-law Jan Janssonius, whose name appears on the Atlas as co-publisher after 1633. His grandson Jodocus III would also follow in his family's footsteps.

Eventually, starting with the first 1606 edition in Latin, about 50 editions of the Atlas were released in the main European languages. In the Islamic world, the atlas was partially translated by the Turkish scholar Kâtip Çelebi. The series is sometimes called the "Mercator/Hondius/Janssonius" series because of Janssonius's later contributions.

== Portrayal of globes in Vermeer's paintings ==
Johannes Vermeer paintings

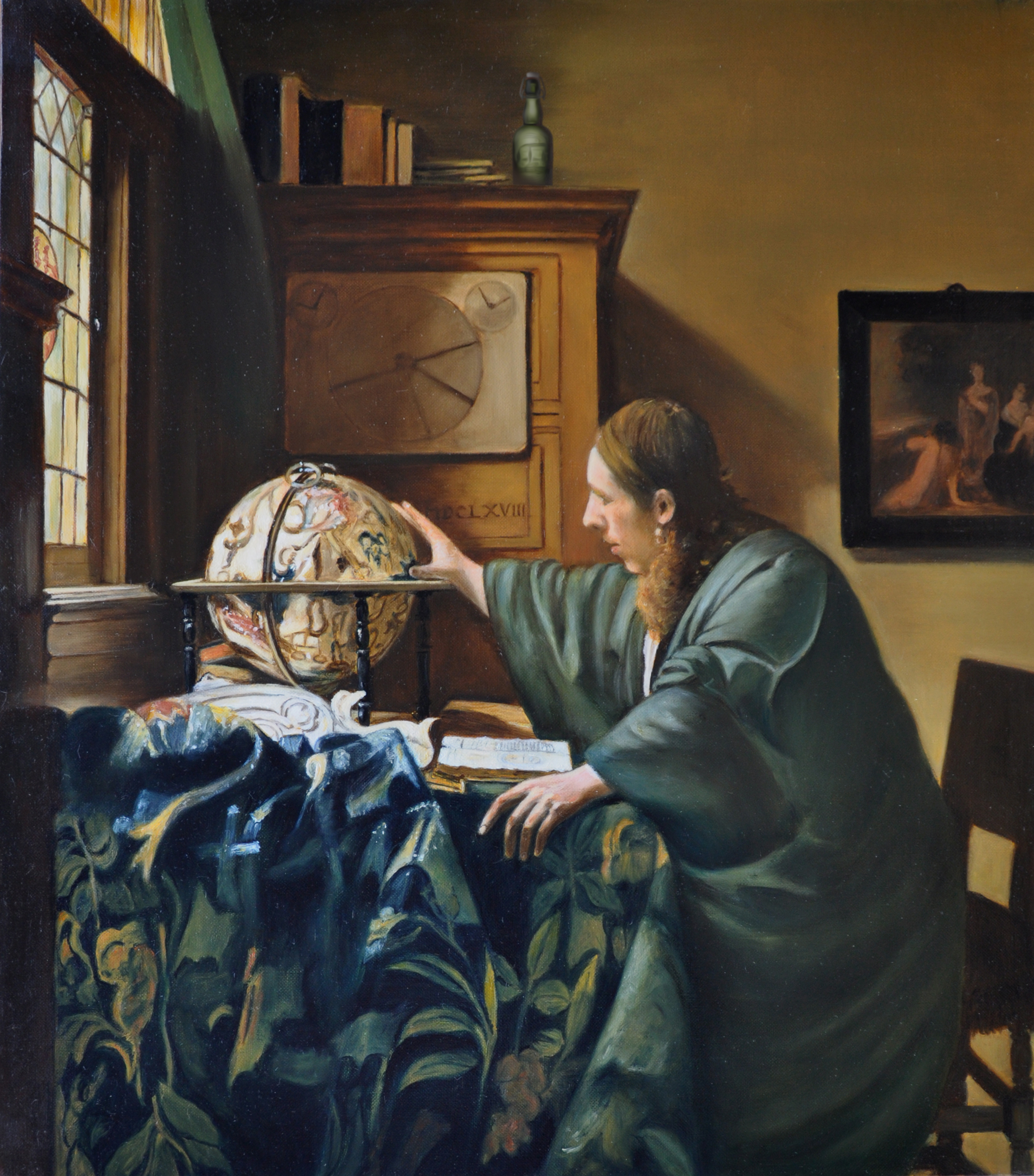
The Astronomer (1668)

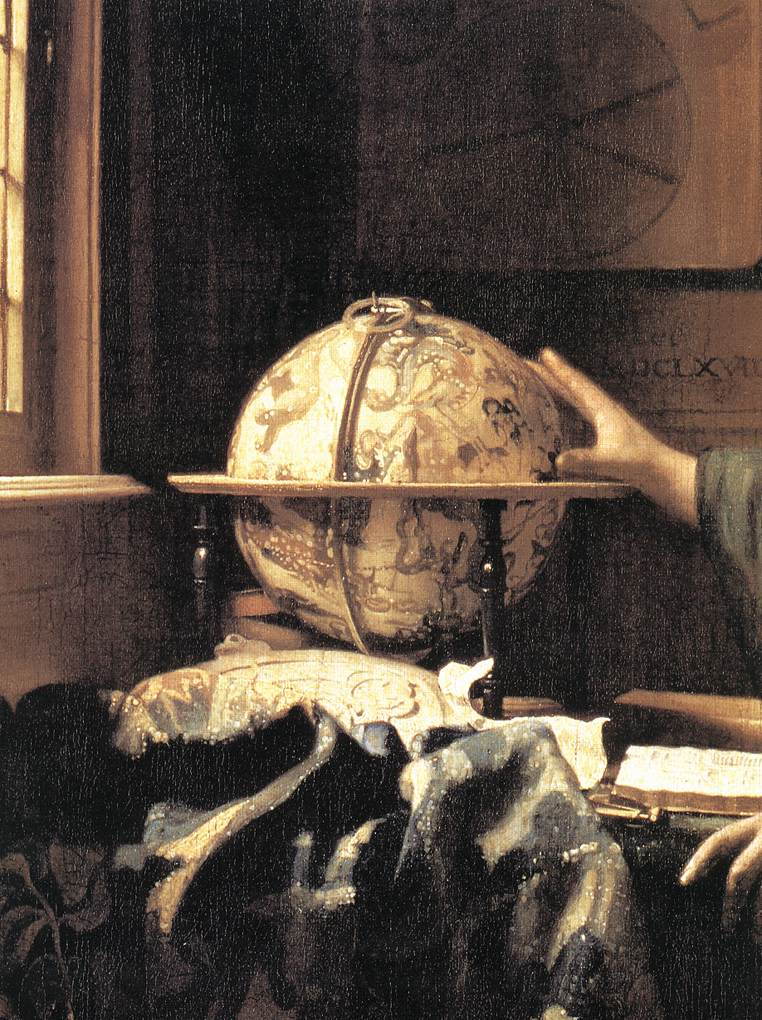
Globe detail

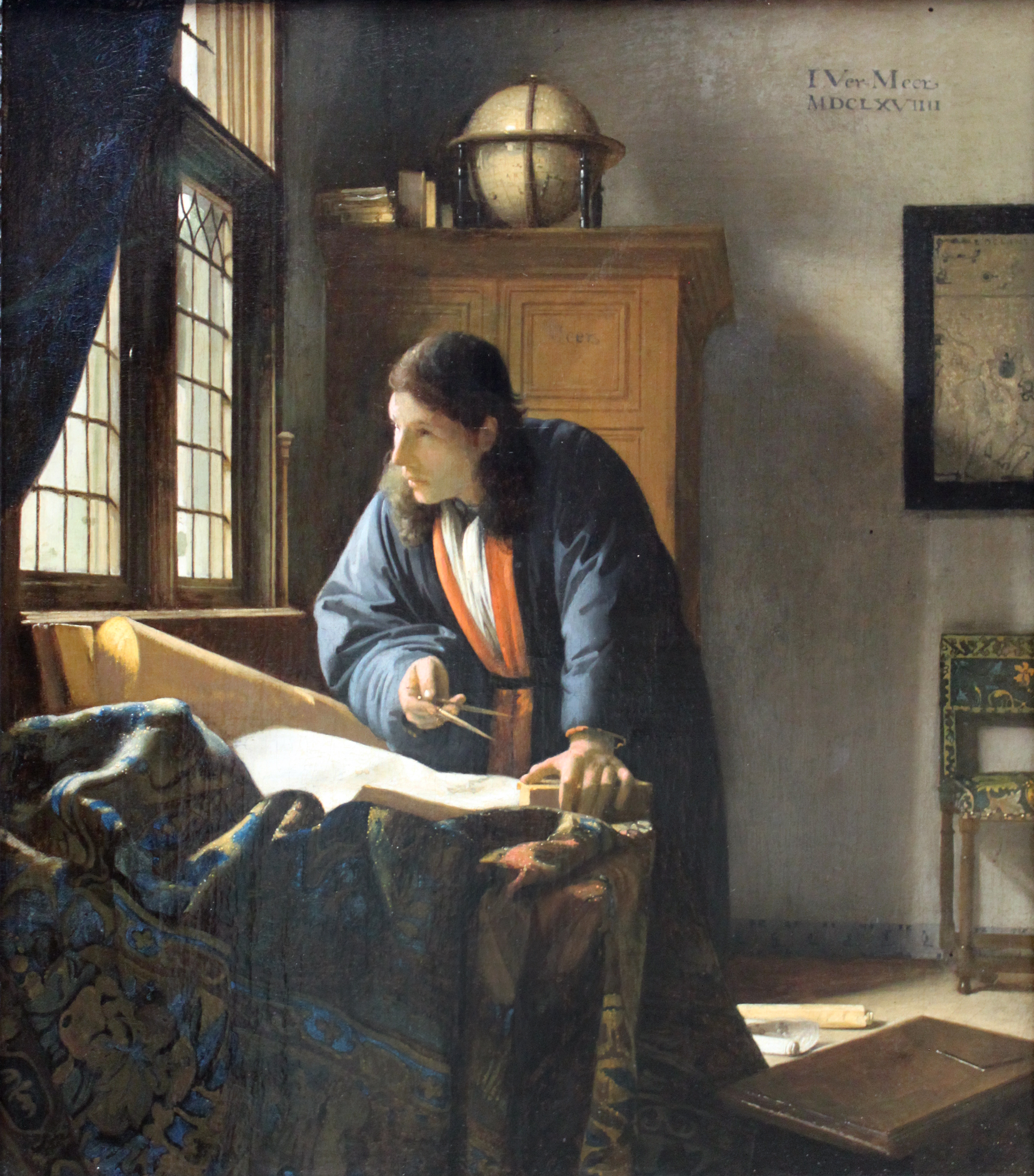
The Geographer (1669)

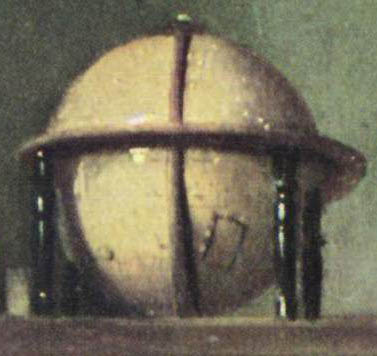
Globe detail

Scholars have argued that the globes depicted in celebrated 17th-century painter Johannes Vermeer's 1668 The Astronomer and 1669 The Geographer were based on a pair of globes by Hondius. Close inspection of these two globes reveals striking similarities to a pair of globes made in 1618 by Hondius. The globes were made as pendants, one depicting the earth while the other depicted the constellations. In Vermeer's The Astronomer the scholar consults a version of Hondius' celestial globe and in The Geographer Hondius' terrestrial globe can be seen placed atop the back cabinet. A version of Hondius' celestial globe can be found in the Scheepvaartmuseum in Amsterdam, and the terrestrial globe can be found in the Hispanic Society Museum & Library in New York City.

== Honours ==
- The Hondius Inlet in Antarctica is named after Jodocus Hondius.
- 457248 Hondius, a 3.2 km main-belt asteroid discovered by Vincenzo Silvano Casulli was named in his honour.
- The Dutch expedition cruise ship MV Hondius is also named after him.

== See also ==
- Theatrum artis scribendi
- MV Hondius, a Dutch cruise ship named after Jodocus Hondius

== Literature ==
- Peter van der Krogt (ed.): Koeman's atlantes Neerlandici, Vol. 1: The folio atlases published by Gerard Mercator, Jodocus Hondius, Henricus Hondius, Johannes Janssonius and their successors, 't Goy-Houten 1997, ISBN 90-6194-268-3
