= Wakken =

- Deelgemeente
- Coordinates: 50°55′49″N 3°23′55″E
- Country: Belgium
- Province: West Flanders
- Municipality: Dentergem

Area
  - Total: 5.36 km^{2} (2.07 sq mi)
- Highest elevation: 18 m (59 ft)
- Lowest elevation: 16 m (52 ft)

Population (2006)
  - Total: 2,801
  - Density: 523/km^{2} (1,350/sq mi)
- Source: NIS
- Postal code: 8720

Wakken is a village and deelgemeente in Dentergem municipality, in the Belgian province of West Flanders. The village is located near the confluence of the rivers Lys and Mandel.

== History ==
Wakken is one of the seven oldest parishes in West Flanders. A charter dated to 791 makes the first known mention of Wakken: "in villa noncupante Wackinio." The spelling of the name has changed several times throughout history: Wackine (870), Wackinna (1010), Wachines (1183), Wackene (1351), Wacken (1467) and Wakken (since 1915).

In the Middle Ages, Wakken was a city without city gates. The fiefdom was owned by the Lords of Harelbeke.

Antoine, bastard-son of Philip the Good, made the court of Wackene to his residence in 1480. His son, Antoine II, married the daughter of Andries Andriessen, knight and Lord of Wackene. Their son Adolf of Burgundy became Governor of Zeeland, Vice Admiral of Flanders and special envoy of Philip II of Spain.

The fiefdom Wackene became a barony in 1614 and a county in 1626. It had its own arrondissement until 1823, when it became part of the arrondissement of Tielt.

== Notable citizens ==
- Joris Van Severen, founder and leader of Verdinaso
- Jodocus Hondius, cartographer, publisher and humanist
- Luc Verbeke, Flemish poet, author, flamingant, co-founder of the Committee for French Flanders
- Hugo Verriest, Flemish priest, author and flamingant
- Modest Huys, painter
- Maurice Meersman, cyclist
