= Pieter van den Keere =

Flemish engraver, publisher, and globe maker

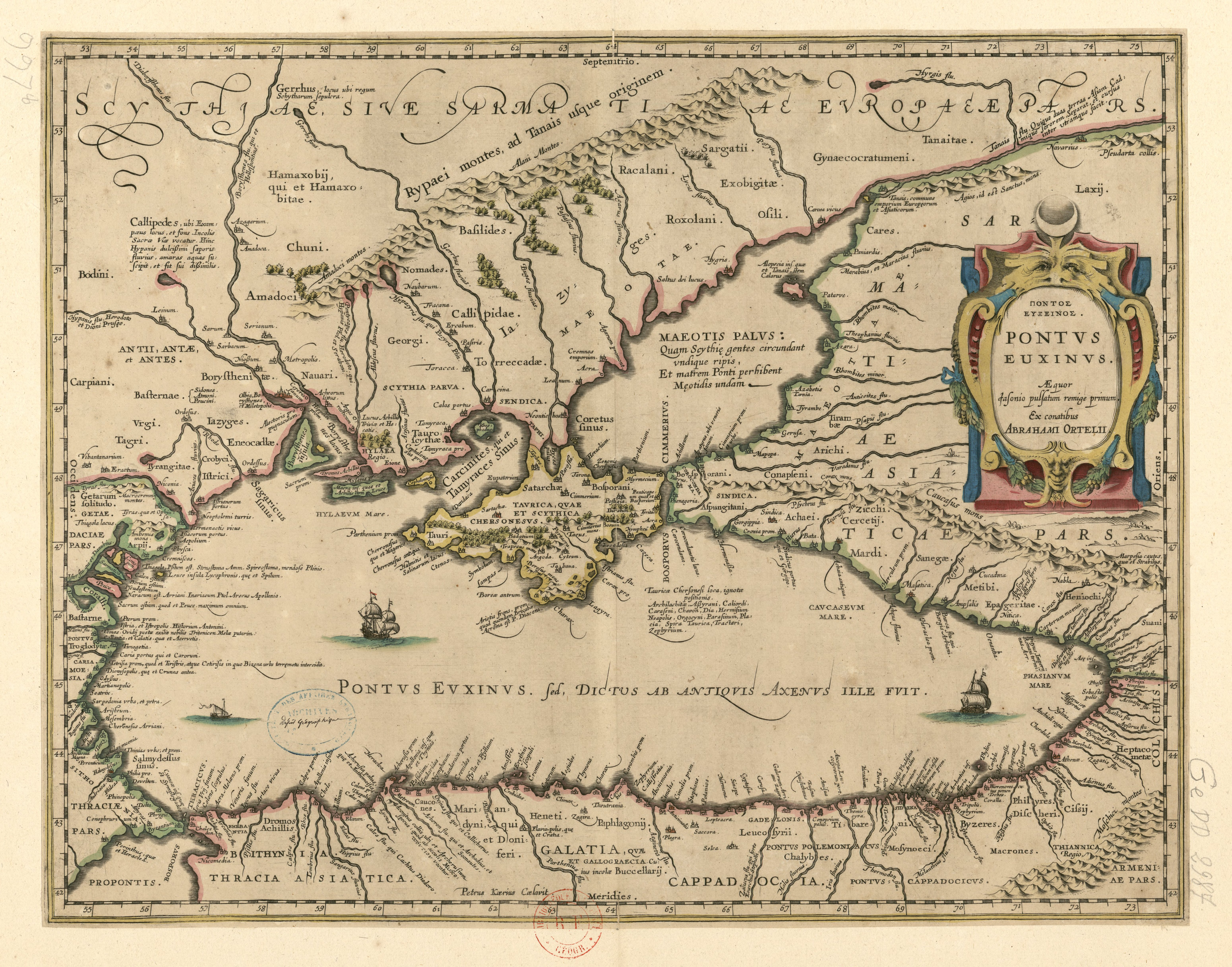
Map of the Black Sea for Abraham Ortelius.

Pieter van den Keere (Latin: Petrus Kaerius; 1571 – c. 1646) was a Flemish engraver, publisher and globe maker who worked for the most part of his career in England and the Dutch Republic.

== Biography ==
Pieter van den Keere was born in Ghent in 1571, the son of the engraver and type founder Hendrik van den Keere and Elisabeth van Estelaer.

During his childhood the family left the Spanish Netherlands for religious reasons and moved to London around 1583–1584. Among his siblings was the engraver Colette van den Keere, who emigrated with the family and later married the cartographer Jodocus Hondius.

While living in London, van den Keere trained as an engraver under Hondius, who became both his brother-in-law and professional mentor.

In 1593, van den Keere and Hondius relocated to Amsterdam. There he was betrothed on 7 September 1599 to Anna Burts (or Beurt) of Ghent. Records indicate that he became betrothed again in Amsterdam on 10 March 1623 to a widow from Hoorn, Anna Winnens van Gent, possibly following the death of his first wife.

After about 1630, few details of van den Keere's life are known. However, the dating of some engraved plates used in John Speed's Prospect of the Most Famous Parts of the World (1646) suggests that he was still alive at that time.

== Works ==
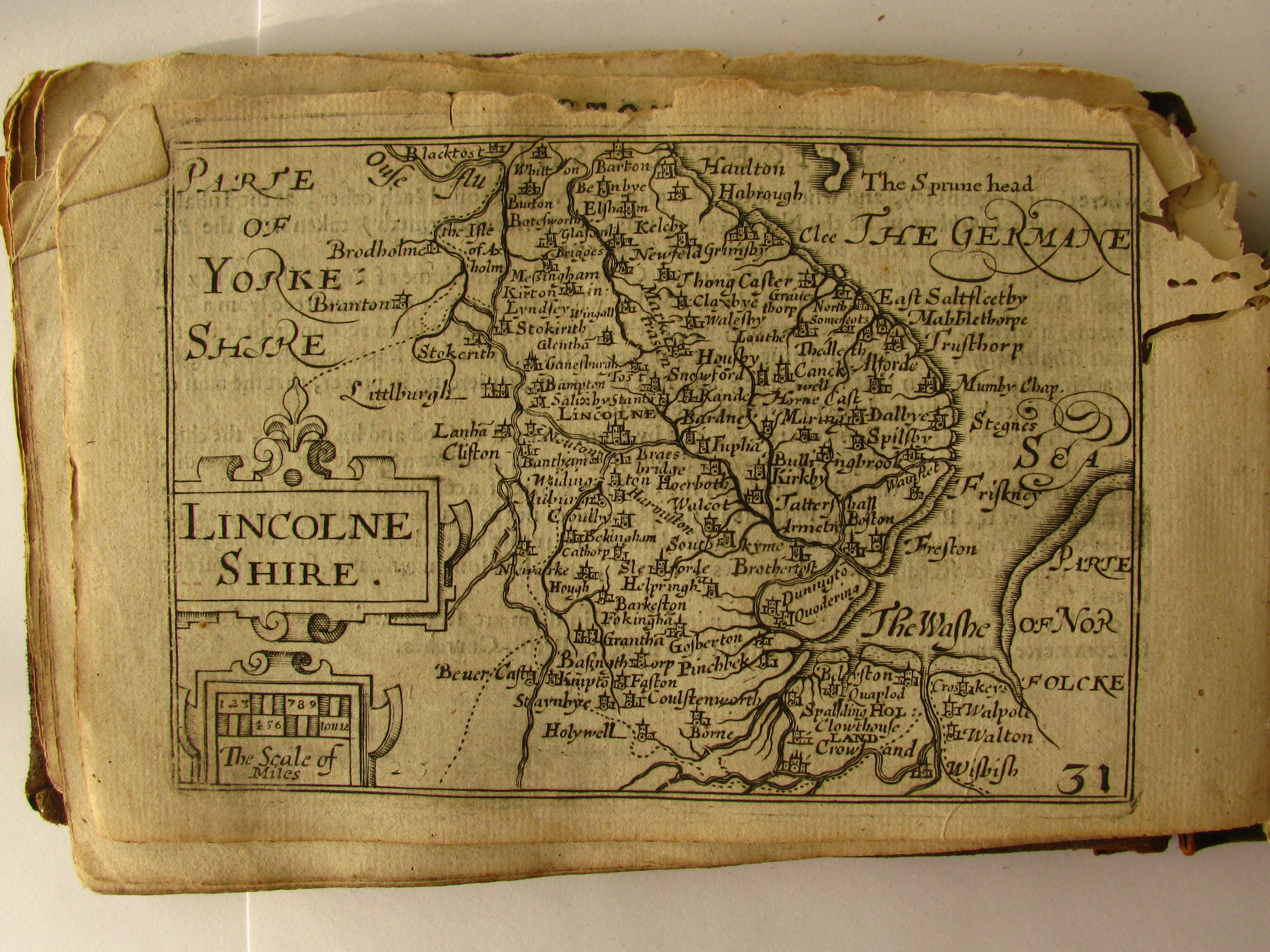
Lincolnshire, map by Pieter van den Keere for a "Miniature Speed Atlas".

From his time in England there is a map of Ireland from 1592, Hyberniae novissima descriptio. It was published by Hondius and served as a model for later editions of the Theatrum of Abraham Ortelius. Keere also contributed to John Norden's Speculum Britanniae of 1593.

For Willem Barents Keere engraved plates for Caertboeck Vande Middel-landsche Zee. He also worked with Petrus Bertius, Cornelis Claesz, Petrus Plancius, the House of Visscher, and Lucas Janszoon Waghenaer. In 1595, there appeared a large wall map of Europe in 10 sheets, Nova totius Europae descriptio.

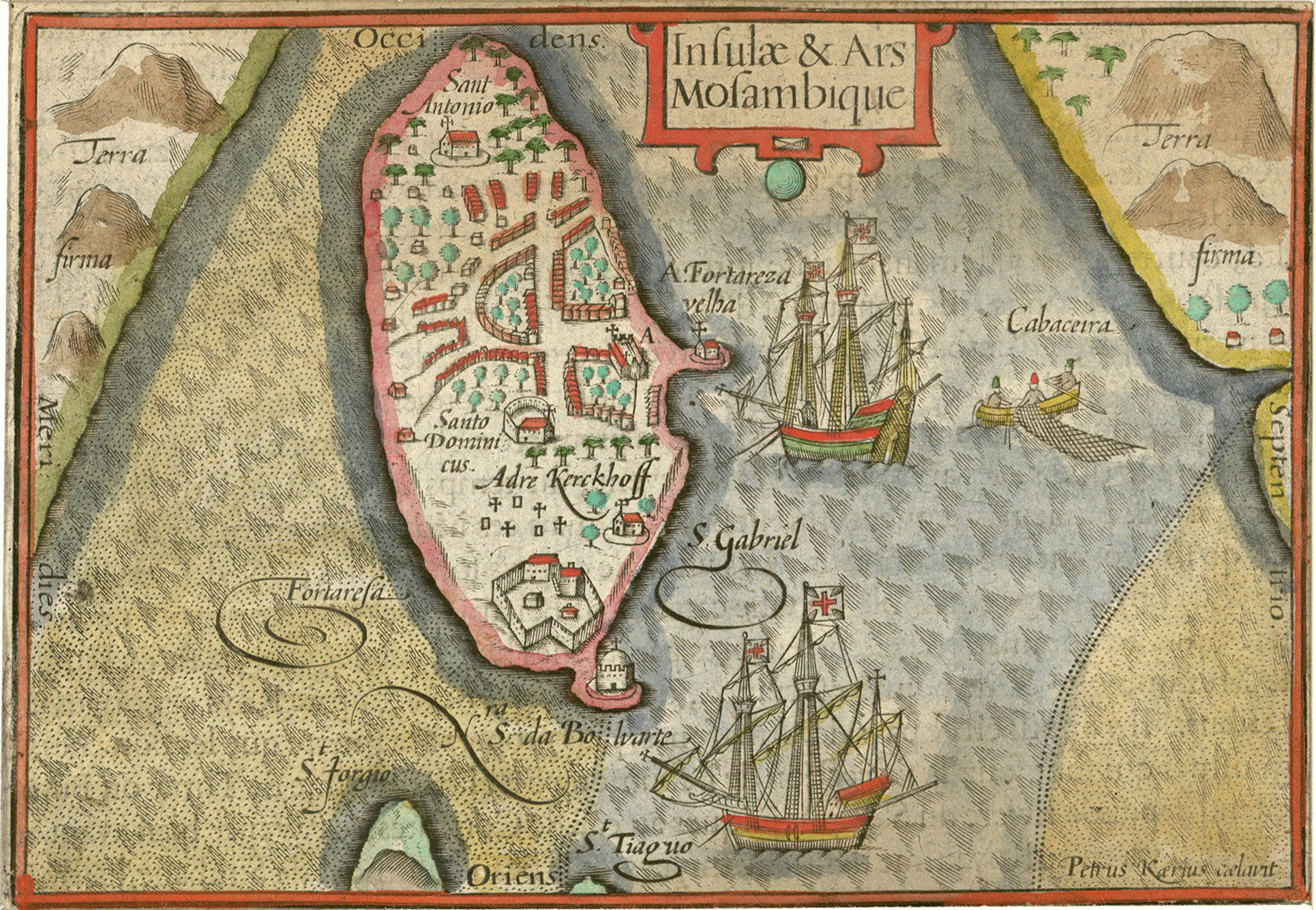
A map of the Island of Mozambique

From 1603, Keere began creating large urban panoramas, including Utrecht, Cologne, Amsterdam, and Paris. Around 1604, he was preparing the publication of the atlas Germania Inferior id est Provincuarum XVII. This first appeared in 1617, with a foreword by Petrus Montanus.

=== Miniature Speeds ===
From around 1599, van den Keere engraved a series of small-format maps of the British Isles, including the counties of England and Wales, as well as Scotland and the provinces of Ireland. These plates were based on earlier cartographic sources, including the work of Christopher Saxton, Abraham Ortelius, and Giovanni Battista Boazio.

Although the plates were engraved by 1599, they did not appear in print until 1617, when they were published in Amsterdam in a Latin edition of Britannia by William Camden, issued by Willem Blaeu; the reasons for this delay of nearly two decades are not clearly documented.

The plates were later acquired by the publisher George Humble (sometimes attributed to William Humble), who in 1627 issued them as a pocket atlas associated with John Speed's The Theatre of the Empire of Great Britaine. In this edition, van den Keere's maps were issued together with the descriptive texts from Speed's atlas and adapted for the smaller format. Because of their association with Speed's work, they became known as the "Miniature Speeds".

Carl Moreland and David Bannister state that in 1627 George Humble published a major edition of Speed's atlas and also issued the van den Keere maps as a pocket edition using the descriptive texts of the larger work. Of the 63 maps in the atlas, 40 were derived from van den Keere's original plates.
