= Henrico =

Henrico may refer to:

== Places ==
=== Colonial America ===
- City of Henrico (Virginia Company), also known as Henrico, a county in the Colony of Virginia
  - Henricus, also called Henrico, a settlement in the county, founded in 1611
- Henrico Shire, one of the eight Shires of Virginia, established in 1634

=== United States ===
- Henrico County, Virginia
- Henrico, North Carolina, an unincorporated community

== People ==
- Henrico Atkins (born 1966), Barbadian former sprinter
- Henrico Botes (born 1979), Namibian former footballer
- Henrico Drost (born 1987), Dutch footballer

== Other uses ==
- USS Henrico (APA-45), an attack transport of World War II and the Korean War
- Henrico High School, Henrico County, Virginia
- Henrico Theatre, Henrico County, on the National Register of Historic Places

== See also ==
- Henricho Bruintjies (born 1993), South African sprinter
- Henricus (disambiguation)
