= Henricus Hondius =

Henricus Hondius is a latinized form of Hendrik Hondt (Hendrik de Hondt), and may refer to the possibly unrelated engravers and cartographers:

- Hendrik Hondius I (1573 –1650), born in Duffel, worked in The Hague, known for his Pictorum aliquot celebrium praecipue Germaniae Inferioris effigies, Hagae Comitis, 1610
- Hendrik Hondius II (1597–1651), lived and worked in Amsterdam, known for his map in the Mercator–Hondius atlas from 1627
- Hendrik Hondius III (1615–1677), born and worked in The Hague, son of Hendrik Hondius I

== See also ==
- Henricus Canisius (1562–1610; latinization of the Dutch name Hendrik de Hondt), Dutch historian
- Hondius (disambiguation)
- Henricus (disambiguation)
- Hendrik (disambiguation)
- De Hondt (surname)
- Hondt (surname)
