= List of minor planets: 457001–458000 =

The following is a partial list of minor planets, running from minor-planet number 457001 through 458000, inclusive. The primary data for this and other partial lists is based on JPL's "Small-Body Orbital Elements" and data available from the Minor Planet Center. Critical list information is also provided by the MPC, unless otherwise specified from Lowell Observatory. A detailed description of the table's columns and additional sources are given on the main page including a complete list of every page in this series, and a statistical break-up on the dynamical classification of minor planets.

Also see the summary list of all named bodies in numerical and alphabetical order, and the corresponding naming citations for the number range of this particular list. New namings may only be added to this list after official publication, as the preannouncement of names is condemned by the Working Group for Small Bodies Nomenclature of the International Astronomical Union.

Near-Earth obj.	MBA (inner)	MBA (outer)	Centaur
Mars-crosser	MBA (middle)	Jupiter trojan	Trans-Neptunian obj.
Unclassified

== 457001–457100 ==
Designation			Discovery			Properties		Ref
Permanent	Provisional	Named after	Date	Site	Discoverer(s)	Category	Diam.	Ref
457001	2008 CN_{54}	—	February 7, 2008	Catalina	CSS	H	600 m	MPC · JPL
457002	2008 CV_{70}	—	December 19, 2007	Mount Lemmon	Mount Lemmon Survey	·	990 m	MPC · JPL
457003	2008 CU_{76}	—	February 6, 2008	Catalina	CSS	H	560 m	MPC · JPL
457004	2008 CZ_{76}	—	February 6, 2008	Catalina	CSS	3:2	7.2 km	MPC · JPL
457005	2008 CN_{77}	—	January 14, 2008	Kitt Peak	Spacewatch	H	540 m	MPC · JPL
457006	2008 CO_{80}	—	February 7, 2008	Kitt Peak	Spacewatch	·	1.4 km	MPC · JPL
457007	2008 CX_{82}	—	February 7, 2008	Kitt Peak	Spacewatch	·	1.2 km	MPC · JPL
457008	2008 CA_{83}	—	February 7, 2008	Kitt Peak	Spacewatch	V	720 m	MPC · JPL
457009	2008 CB_{87}	—	February 7, 2008	Mount Lemmon	Mount Lemmon Survey	PHO	2.8 km	MPC · JPL
457010	2008 CO_{87}	—	February 7, 2008	Mount Lemmon	Mount Lemmon Survey	·	1.1 km	MPC · JPL
457011	2008 CY_{92}	—	February 8, 2008	Kitt Peak	Spacewatch	·	820 m	MPC · JPL
457012	2008 CZ_{92}	—	February 8, 2008	Kitt Peak	Spacewatch	H	550 m	MPC · JPL
457013	2008 CY_{109}	—	March 15, 2004	Kitt Peak	Spacewatch	·	740 m	MPC · JPL
457014	2008 CT_{115}	—	February 10, 2008	Catalina	CSS	·	1.6 km	MPC · JPL
457015	2008 CY_{116}	—	January 1, 2008	Mount Lemmon	Mount Lemmon Survey	·	1.3 km	MPC · JPL
457016	2008 CZ_{119}	—	February 7, 2008	Mount Lemmon	Mount Lemmon Survey	H	580 m	MPC · JPL
457017	2008 CN_{120}	—	February 6, 2008	Catalina	CSS	H	570 m	MPC · JPL
457018	2008 CT_{120}	—	February 6, 2008	Catalina	CSS	H	570 m	MPC · JPL
457019	2008 CL_{123}	—	February 7, 2008	Mount Lemmon	Mount Lemmon Survey	·	670 m	MPC · JPL
457020	2008 CP_{131}	—	January 20, 2008	Mount Lemmon	Mount Lemmon Survey	EUN	1.4 km	MPC · JPL
457021	2008 CL_{134}	—	December 30, 2007	Mount Lemmon	Mount Lemmon Survey	MAR	1.2 km	MPC · JPL
457022	2008 CX_{137}	—	February 8, 2008	Kitt Peak	Spacewatch	EUN	820 m	MPC · JPL
457023	2008 CP_{141}	—	February 8, 2008	Kitt Peak	Spacewatch	(194)	1.0 km	MPC · JPL
457024	2008 CZ_{142}	—	February 8, 2008	Kitt Peak	Spacewatch	·	1.4 km	MPC · JPL
457025	2008 CQ_{144}	—	February 9, 2008	Kitt Peak	Spacewatch	·	1.0 km	MPC · JPL
457026	2008 CG_{145}	—	February 9, 2008	Kitt Peak	Spacewatch	·	1.1 km	MPC · JPL
457027	2008 CQ_{146}	—	November 20, 2007	Mount Lemmon	Mount Lemmon Survey	·	1.5 km	MPC · JPL
457028	2008 CY_{148}	—	January 15, 2008	Mount Lemmon	Mount Lemmon Survey	·	960 m	MPC · JPL
457029	2008 CD_{159}	—	February 9, 2008	Catalina	CSS	·	780 m	MPC · JPL
457030	2008 CH_{160}	—	February 9, 2008	Kitt Peak	Spacewatch	·	790 m	MPC · JPL
457031	2008 CD_{166}	—	February 1, 2008	Mount Lemmon	Mount Lemmon Survey	·	1.3 km	MPC · JPL
457032	2008 CZ_{169}	—	February 12, 2008	Mount Lemmon	Mount Lemmon Survey	·	1.2 km	MPC · JPL
457033	2008 CU_{172}	—	February 13, 2008	Kitt Peak	Spacewatch	EUN	1.2 km	MPC · JPL
457034	2008 CA_{179}	—	February 6, 2008	Catalina	CSS	H	570 m	MPC · JPL
457035	2008 CM_{181}	—	February 13, 2008	Anderson Mesa	LONEOS	H	650 m	MPC · JPL
457036	2008 CT_{186}	—	February 2, 2008	Catalina	CSS	·	2.5 km	MPC · JPL
457037	2008 CB_{191}	—	February 2, 2008	Kitt Peak	Spacewatch	·	750 m	MPC · JPL
457038	2008 CT_{193}	—	February 8, 2008	Kitt Peak	Spacewatch	·	1.3 km	MPC · JPL
457039	2008 CV_{196}	—	February 7, 2008	Kitt Peak	Spacewatch	·	750 m	MPC · JPL
457040	2008 CR_{199}	—	February 13, 2008	Mount Lemmon	Mount Lemmon Survey	·	1.2 km	MPC · JPL
457041	2008 CW_{201}	—	February 9, 2008	Mount Lemmon	Mount Lemmon Survey	·	2.1 km	MPC · JPL
457042	2008 CT_{203}	—	February 12, 2008	Kitt Peak	Spacewatch	·	870 m	MPC · JPL
457043	2008 CV_{203}	—	February 12, 2008	Kitt Peak	Spacewatch	·	800 m	MPC · JPL
457044	2008 CA_{206}	—	December 31, 2007	Kitt Peak	Spacewatch	PHO	920 m	MPC · JPL
457045	2008 CT_{214}	—	February 12, 2008	Mount Lemmon	Mount Lemmon Survey	·	1.4 km	MPC · JPL
457046	2008 DD_{4}	—	February 18, 2008	Mount Lemmon	Mount Lemmon Survey	·	1.2 km	MPC · JPL
457047	2008 DQ_{10}	—	January 10, 2008	Mount Lemmon	Mount Lemmon Survey	·	1.5 km	MPC · JPL
457048	2008 DY_{10}	—	January 11, 2008	Kitt Peak	Spacewatch	·	820 m	MPC · JPL
457049	2008 DN_{17}	—	February 24, 2008	Kitt Peak	Spacewatch	·	1.8 km	MPC · JPL
457050	2008 DJ_{25}	—	February 28, 2008	Mount Lemmon	Mount Lemmon Survey	(5)	950 m	MPC · JPL
457051	2008 DJ_{27}	—	February 29, 2008	Mount Lemmon	Mount Lemmon Survey	·	1.5 km	MPC · JPL
457052	2008 DH_{31}	—	January 10, 2008	Mount Lemmon	Mount Lemmon Survey	·	930 m	MPC · JPL
457053	2008 DA_{49}	—	February 29, 2008	Catalina	CSS	H	640 m	MPC · JPL
457054	2008 DZ_{49}	—	February 29, 2008	Mount Lemmon	Mount Lemmon Survey	·	1.1 km	MPC · JPL
457055	2008 DT_{50}	—	February 29, 2008	Kitt Peak	Spacewatch	·	1.5 km	MPC · JPL
457056	2008 DV_{53}	—	January 9, 2008	Mount Lemmon	Mount Lemmon Survey	·	1.1 km	MPC · JPL
457057	2008 DZ_{59}	—	February 27, 2008	Kitt Peak	Spacewatch	·	1.7 km	MPC · JPL
457058	2008 DN_{75}	—	February 28, 2008	Mount Lemmon	Mount Lemmon Survey	·	1.2 km	MPC · JPL
457059	2008 EG	—	March 1, 2008	Catalina	CSS	ATE	350 m	MPC · JPL
457060	2008 ET_{3}	—	February 18, 2008	Mount Lemmon	Mount Lemmon Survey	·	1.7 km	MPC · JPL
457061	2008 EM_{5}	—	March 2, 2008	Kitt Peak	Spacewatch	EUN	1.0 km	MPC · JPL
457062	2008 EJ_{23}	—	February 18, 2008	Mount Lemmon	Mount Lemmon Survey	·	2.0 km	MPC · JPL
457063	2008 EC_{37}	—	November 21, 2007	Mount Lemmon	Mount Lemmon Survey	H	460 m	MPC · JPL
457064	2008 EX_{44}	—	March 5, 2008	Kitt Peak	Spacewatch	MAR	980 m	MPC · JPL
457065	2008 EZ_{44}	—	February 2, 2008	Mount Lemmon	Mount Lemmon Survey	·	960 m	MPC · JPL
457066	2008 EB_{45}	—	March 5, 2008	Kitt Peak	Spacewatch	·	1.1 km	MPC · JPL
457067	2008 ER_{47}	—	March 5, 2008	Mount Lemmon	Mount Lemmon Survey	·	1.6 km	MPC · JPL
457068	2008 EK_{49}	—	February 27, 2008	Kitt Peak	Spacewatch	·	1.1 km	MPC · JPL
457069	2008 EJ_{53}	—	March 6, 2008	Mount Lemmon	Mount Lemmon Survey	·	1.2 km	MPC · JPL
457070	2008 EG_{54}	—	March 6, 2008	Mount Lemmon	Mount Lemmon Survey	·	1.1 km	MPC · JPL
457071	2008 EP_{57}	—	February 28, 2008	Kitt Peak	Spacewatch	·	1.2 km	MPC · JPL
457072	2008 EM_{66}	—	March 9, 2008	Mount Lemmon	Mount Lemmon Survey	·	1.1 km	MPC · JPL
457073	2008 EO_{68}	—	March 11, 2008	Catalina	CSS	H	560 m	MPC · JPL
457074	2008 EE_{69}	—	March 6, 2008	Kleť	Kleť	·	1.2 km	MPC · JPL
457075	2008 EK_{72}	—	March 6, 2008	Mount Lemmon	Mount Lemmon Survey	EUN	1.0 km	MPC · JPL
457076	2008 EP_{77}	—	February 28, 2008	Kitt Peak	Spacewatch	·	930 m	MPC · JPL
457077	2008 EU_{82}	—	February 9, 2008	Catalina	CSS	·	1.6 km	MPC · JPL
457078	2008 EN_{90}	—	February 11, 2008	Mount Lemmon	Mount Lemmon Survey	·	1.7 km	MPC · JPL
457079	2008 EN_{92}	—	March 3, 2008	Catalina	CSS	EUN	1.3 km	MPC · JPL
457080	2008 EA_{96}	—	March 6, 2008	Mount Lemmon	Mount Lemmon Survey	·	1.4 km	MPC · JPL
457081	2008 EZ_{98}	—	March 4, 2008	Catalina	CSS	·	1.2 km	MPC · JPL
457082	2008 EE_{100}	—	March 3, 2008	Kitt Peak	Spacewatch	H	490 m	MPC · JPL
457083	2008 EE_{107}	—	March 6, 2008	Mount Lemmon	Mount Lemmon Survey	·	1.6 km	MPC · JPL
457084	2008 ER_{111}	—	March 8, 2008	Kitt Peak	Spacewatch	·	1.6 km	MPC · JPL
457085	2008 EA_{113}	—	March 8, 2008	Kitt Peak	Spacewatch	·	1.1 km	MPC · JPL
457086	2008 ES_{114}	—	February 2, 2008	Mount Lemmon	Mount Lemmon Survey	·	1.5 km	MPC · JPL
457087	2008 EV_{117}	—	January 30, 2008	Mount Lemmon	Mount Lemmon Survey	·	780 m	MPC · JPL
457088	2008 EF_{121}	—	February 28, 2008	Kitt Peak	Spacewatch	·	1.5 km	MPC · JPL
457089	2008 ER_{123}	—	January 30, 2008	Mount Lemmon	Mount Lemmon Survey	·	1.4 km	MPC · JPL
457090	2008 ET_{123}	—	January 11, 2008	Kitt Peak	Spacewatch	·	870 m	MPC · JPL
457091	2008 EQ_{124}	—	March 10, 2008	Mount Lemmon	Mount Lemmon Survey	·	1.0 km	MPC · JPL
457092	2008 EH_{127}	—	March 10, 2008	Kitt Peak	Spacewatch	·	1.1 km	MPC · JPL
457093	2008 ER_{127}	—	March 11, 2008	Kitt Peak	Spacewatch	·	850 m	MPC · JPL
457094	2008 EL_{131}	—	February 28, 2008	Kitt Peak	Spacewatch	(5)	980 m	MPC · JPL
457095	2008 EW_{134}	—	April 19, 2004	Kitt Peak	Spacewatch	·	1.0 km	MPC · JPL
457096	2008 EL_{136}	—	February 28, 2008	Kitt Peak	Spacewatch	·	1.2 km	MPC · JPL
457097	2008 EU_{144}	—	February 24, 2008	Kitt Peak	Spacewatch	·	1.0 km	MPC · JPL
457098	2008 EB_{147}	—	March 7, 2008	Mount Nyukasa	Japan Aerospace Exploration Agency	·	1.1 km	MPC · JPL
457099	2008 EN_{147}	—	March 1, 2008	Kitt Peak	Spacewatch	·	1.5 km	MPC · JPL
457100	2008 ET_{151}	—	March 8, 2008	Kitt Peak	Spacewatch	·	1.3 km	MPC · JPL

== 457101–457200 ==
back to top

Designation			Discovery			Properties		Ref
Permanent	Provisional	Named after	Date	Site	Discoverer(s)	Category	Diam.	Ref
457101	2008 EK_{152}	—	March 10, 2008	Kitt Peak	Spacewatch	·	1.3 km	MPC · JPL
457102	2008 EF_{157}	—	March 15, 2008	Mount Lemmon	Mount Lemmon Survey	·	1.1 km	MPC · JPL
457103	2008 EY_{157}	—	March 1, 2008	Kitt Peak	Spacewatch	EUN	990 m	MPC · JPL
457104	2008 EV_{160}	—	March 1, 2008	Kitt Peak	Spacewatch	·	1.2 km	MPC · JPL
457105	2008 EQ_{164}	—	March 1, 2008	Kitt Peak	Spacewatch	CLO	2.2 km	MPC · JPL
457106	2008 EJ_{167}	—	March 8, 2008	Catalina	CSS	H	630 m	MPC · JPL
457107	2008 FH_{1}	—	March 12, 2008	Kitt Peak	Spacewatch	·	990 m	MPC · JPL
457108	2008 FR_{6}	—	February 8, 2008	Mount Lemmon	Mount Lemmon Survey	·	1.1 km	MPC · JPL
457109	2008 FO_{11}	—	February 8, 2008	Kitt Peak	Spacewatch	·	1.0 km	MPC · JPL
457110	2008 FF_{12}	—	February 11, 2008	Kitt Peak	Spacewatch	·	830 m	MPC · JPL
457111	2008 FA_{13}	—	March 1, 2008	Kitt Peak	Spacewatch	MAS	590 m	MPC · JPL
457112	2008 FC_{13}	—	March 26, 2008	Mount Lemmon	Mount Lemmon Survey	·	1.1 km	MPC · JPL
457113	2008 FH_{13}	—	March 26, 2008	Mount Lemmon	Mount Lemmon Survey	·	1.0 km	MPC · JPL
457114	2008 FW_{15}	—	March 26, 2008	Kitt Peak	Spacewatch	RAF	820 m	MPC · JPL
457115	2008 FT_{16}	—	February 10, 2008	Kitt Peak	Spacewatch	·	1.5 km	MPC · JPL
457116	2008 FL_{19}	—	October 21, 2006	Mount Lemmon	Mount Lemmon Survey	·	1.3 km	MPC · JPL
457117	2008 FS_{24}	—	March 27, 2008	Kitt Peak	Spacewatch	·	1.3 km	MPC · JPL
457118	2008 FZ_{26}	—	March 27, 2008	Kitt Peak	Spacewatch	JUN	990 m	MPC · JPL
457119	2008 FR_{27}	—	March 27, 2008	Kitt Peak	Spacewatch	·	1.4 km	MPC · JPL
457120	2008 FB_{30}	—	January 30, 2008	Mount Lemmon	Mount Lemmon Survey	RAF	700 m	MPC · JPL
457121	2008 FS_{33}	—	March 28, 2008	Mount Lemmon	Mount Lemmon Survey	·	710 m	MPC · JPL
457122	2008 FP_{38}	—	March 28, 2008	Kitt Peak	Spacewatch	·	1.3 km	MPC · JPL
457123	2008 FV_{49}	—	March 28, 2008	Mount Lemmon	Mount Lemmon Survey	·	910 m	MPC · JPL
457124	2008 FS_{51}	—	August 28, 2005	Kitt Peak	Spacewatch	·	1.3 km	MPC · JPL
457125	2008 FF_{52}	—	February 29, 2008	Kitt Peak	Spacewatch	·	1.5 km	MPC · JPL
457126	2008 FJ_{52}	—	September 24, 2005	Kitt Peak	Spacewatch	·	1.1 km	MPC · JPL
457127	2008 FF_{58}	—	March 28, 2008	Mount Lemmon	Mount Lemmon Survey	·	2.0 km	MPC · JPL
457128	2008 FP_{58}	—	March 28, 2008	Mount Lemmon	Mount Lemmon Survey	·	1.6 km	MPC · JPL
457129	2008 FQ_{63}	—	March 10, 2008	Mount Lemmon	Mount Lemmon Survey	·	880 m	MPC · JPL
457130	2008 FB_{65}	—	March 28, 2008	Kitt Peak	Spacewatch	·	980 m	MPC · JPL
457131	2008 FB_{68}	—	March 28, 2008	Mount Lemmon	Mount Lemmon Survey	H	600 m	MPC · JPL
457132	2008 FA_{71}	—	March 29, 2008	Mount Lemmon	Mount Lemmon Survey	·	1.3 km	MPC · JPL
457133	2008 FG_{75}	—	March 31, 2008	Mount Lemmon	Mount Lemmon Survey	·	1.2 km	MPC · JPL
457134	2008 FB_{80}	—	March 1, 2008	Kitt Peak	Spacewatch	MIS	2.7 km	MPC · JPL
457135	2008 FN_{80}	—	March 27, 2008	Mount Lemmon	Mount Lemmon Survey	·	1.5 km	MPC · JPL
457136	2008 FD_{86}	—	March 28, 2008	Mount Lemmon	Mount Lemmon Survey	EUN	910 m	MPC · JPL
457137	2008 FA_{91}	—	March 29, 2008	Mount Lemmon	Mount Lemmon Survey	·	1.3 km	MPC · JPL
457138	2008 FW_{96}	—	March 29, 2008	Kitt Peak	Spacewatch	·	1.3 km	MPC · JPL
457139	2008 FK_{99}	—	March 30, 2008	Kitt Peak	Spacewatch	·	1.5 km	MPC · JPL
457140	2008 FF_{101}	—	March 30, 2008	Kitt Peak	Spacewatch	·	1.3 km	MPC · JPL
457141	2008 FG_{103}	—	March 30, 2008	Kitt Peak	Spacewatch	·	1.3 km	MPC · JPL
457142	2008 FP_{114}	—	March 31, 2008	Mount Lemmon	Mount Lemmon Survey	H	520 m	MPC · JPL
457143	2008 FT_{122}	—	March 27, 2008	Mount Lemmon	Mount Lemmon Survey	·	1.9 km	MPC · JPL
457144	2008 FL_{126}	—	March 29, 2008	Kitt Peak	Spacewatch	·	1.8 km	MPC · JPL
457145	2008 FV_{126}	—	March 31, 2008	Mount Lemmon	Mount Lemmon Survey	JUN	1.1 km	MPC · JPL
457146	2008 FE_{128}	—	March 28, 2008	Kitt Peak	Spacewatch	·	1.2 km	MPC · JPL
457147	2008 FZ_{129}	—	March 28, 2008	Kitt Peak	Spacewatch	·	830 m	MPC · JPL
457148	2008 FP_{130}	—	March 30, 2008	Catalina	CSS	·	1.4 km	MPC · JPL
457149	2008 FY_{132}	—	March 30, 2008	Kitt Peak	Spacewatch	MIS	1.8 km	MPC · JPL
457150	2008 FD_{133}	—	March 30, 2008	Kitt Peak	Spacewatch	L5	11 km	MPC · JPL
457151	2008 FE_{133}	—	March 30, 2008	Kitt Peak	Spacewatch	(5)	1.3 km	MPC · JPL
457152	2008 FQ_{133}	—	March 28, 2008	Mount Lemmon	Mount Lemmon Survey	·	950 m	MPC · JPL
457153	2008 FN_{134}	—	March 30, 2008	Kitt Peak	Spacewatch	MIS	2.1 km	MPC · JPL
457154	2008 FW_{136}	—	March 29, 2008	Catalina	CSS	fast	3.0 km	MPC · JPL
457155	2008 GU	—	April 3, 2008	Socorro	LINEAR	·	1.4 km	MPC · JPL
457156	2008 GS_{5}	—	February 2, 2008	Kitt Peak	Spacewatch	·	1.0 km	MPC · JPL
457157	2008 GT_{7}	—	April 1, 2008	Kitt Peak	Spacewatch	·	1.4 km	MPC · JPL
457158	2008 GW_{11}	—	April 1, 2008	Kitt Peak	Spacewatch	·	2.1 km	MPC · JPL
457159	2008 GY_{11}	—	April 1, 2008	Kitt Peak	Spacewatch	·	2.4 km	MPC · JPL
457160	2008 GF_{14}	—	April 3, 2008	Mount Lemmon	Mount Lemmon Survey	·	1.5 km	MPC · JPL
457161	2008 GP_{34}	—	March 27, 2008	Mount Lemmon	Mount Lemmon Survey	·	1.5 km	MPC · JPL
457162	2008 GV_{34}	—	April 3, 2008	Mount Lemmon	Mount Lemmon Survey	·	1.1 km	MPC · JPL
457163	2008 GJ_{38}	—	April 3, 2008	Mount Lemmon	Mount Lemmon Survey	·	1.2 km	MPC · JPL
457164	2008 GA_{44}	—	April 4, 2008	Kitt Peak	Spacewatch	·	1.8 km	MPC · JPL
457165	2008 GR_{52}	—	February 9, 2008	Mount Lemmon	Mount Lemmon Survey	·	1.4 km	MPC · JPL
457166	2008 GD_{57}	—	March 28, 2008	Kitt Peak	Spacewatch	·	1.4 km	MPC · JPL
457167	2008 GA_{67}	—	April 6, 2008	Mount Lemmon	Mount Lemmon Survey	·	1.4 km	MPC · JPL
457168	2008 GE_{67}	—	April 6, 2008	Mount Lemmon	Mount Lemmon Survey	·	1.4 km	MPC · JPL
457169	2008 GL_{69}	—	March 29, 2008	Kitt Peak	Spacewatch	·	1.2 km	MPC · JPL
457170	2008 GM_{69}	—	February 18, 2008	Mount Lemmon	Mount Lemmon Survey	·	1.9 km	MPC · JPL
457171	2008 GA_{73}	—	March 4, 2008	Mount Lemmon	Mount Lemmon Survey	·	1.4 km	MPC · JPL
457172	2008 GY_{73}	—	April 7, 2008	Kitt Peak	Spacewatch	·	1.5 km	MPC · JPL
457173	2008 GS_{80}	—	January 17, 2007	Mount Lemmon	Mount Lemmon Survey	·	2.1 km	MPC · JPL
457174	2008 GA_{81}	—	March 31, 2008	Mount Lemmon	Mount Lemmon Survey	·	940 m	MPC · JPL
457175	2008 GO_{98}	—	April 8, 2008	Kitt Peak	Spacewatch	T_{j} (2.93) · 3:2 · Comet (362P)	20 km	MPC · JPL
457176	2008 GF_{100}	—	April 9, 2008	Kitt Peak	Spacewatch	·	1.1 km	MPC · JPL
457177	2008 GC_{105}	—	November 20, 2006	Kitt Peak	Spacewatch	·	900 m	MPC · JPL
457178	2008 GU_{105}	—	April 11, 2008	Catalina	CSS	·	1.7 km	MPC · JPL
457179	2008 GX_{110}	—	April 3, 2008	Catalina	CSS	·	2.4 km	MPC · JPL
457180	2008 GD_{115}	—	March 30, 2008	Kitt Peak	Spacewatch	·	1.4 km	MPC · JPL
457181	2008 GF_{115}	—	April 11, 2008	Kitt Peak	Spacewatch	·	1.8 km	MPC · JPL
457182	2008 GW_{120}	—	March 30, 2008	Catalina	CSS	·	2.0 km	MPC · JPL
457183	2008 GZ_{123}	—	April 13, 2008	Mount Lemmon	Mount Lemmon Survey	JUN	930 m	MPC · JPL
457184	2008 GE_{124}	—	April 14, 2008	Mount Lemmon	Mount Lemmon Survey	H	710 m	MPC · JPL
457185	2008 GW_{124}	—	March 11, 2008	Mount Lemmon	Mount Lemmon Survey	·	910 m	MPC · JPL
457186	2008 GS_{137}	—	April 7, 2008	Kitt Peak	Spacewatch	ADE	1.7 km	MPC · JPL
457187	2008 GN_{139}	—	April 4, 2008	Kitt Peak	Spacewatch	·	1.6 km	MPC · JPL
457188	2008 GO_{143}	—	February 2, 2008	Mount Lemmon	Mount Lemmon Survey	·	1.5 km	MPC · JPL
457189	2008 GB_{144}	—	April 7, 2008	Catalina	CSS	·	1.9 km	MPC · JPL
457190	2008 GC_{144}	—	November 10, 2005	Mount Lemmon	Mount Lemmon Survey	·	4.2 km	MPC · JPL
457191	2008 GA_{146}	—	April 14, 2008	Catalina	CSS	·	1.3 km	MPC · JPL
457192	2008 HV	—	February 1, 1995	Kitt Peak	Spacewatch	·	960 m	MPC · JPL
457193	2008 HS_{6}	—	April 4, 2008	Catalina	CSS	·	1.4 km	MPC · JPL
457194	2008 HN_{13}	—	April 25, 2008	Kitt Peak	Spacewatch	KON	2.0 km	MPC · JPL
457195	2008 HQ_{16}	—	April 25, 2008	Catalina	CSS	·	1.4 km	MPC · JPL
457196	2008 HZ_{17}	—	April 15, 2008	Mount Lemmon	Mount Lemmon Survey	·	1.1 km	MPC · JPL
457197	2008 HJ_{22}	—	April 26, 2008	Kitt Peak	Spacewatch	·	2.5 km	MPC · JPL
457198	2008 HH_{25}	—	April 14, 2008	Mount Lemmon	Mount Lemmon Survey	MIS	1.7 km	MPC · JPL
457199	2008 HC_{39}	—	April 26, 2008	Mount Lemmon	Mount Lemmon Survey	EUN	1 km	MPC · JPL
457200	2008 HC_{44}	—	March 28, 2008	Mount Lemmon	Mount Lemmon Survey	·	1.6 km	MPC · JPL

== 457201–457300 ==
back to top

Designation			Discovery			Properties		Ref
Permanent	Provisional	Named after	Date	Site	Discoverer(s)	Category	Diam.	Ref
457201	2008 HQ_{44}	—	April 27, 2008	Kitt Peak	Spacewatch	·	1.2 km	MPC · JPL
457202	2008 HV_{48}	—	April 29, 2008	Kitt Peak	Spacewatch	·	1.2 km	MPC · JPL
457203	2008 HT_{55}	—	April 29, 2008	Kitt Peak	Spacewatch	·	1.3 km	MPC · JPL
457204	2008 HL_{62}	—	April 14, 2008	Mount Lemmon	Mount Lemmon Survey	·	1.0 km	MPC · JPL
457205	2008 JA_{3}	—	May 3, 2008	Dauban	Kugel, F.	MAR	1 km	MPC · JPL
457206	2008 JM_{8}	—	May 1, 2008	Catalina	CSS	(5)	1.2 km	MPC · JPL
457207	2008 JL_{9}	—	April 11, 2008	Mount Lemmon	Mount Lemmon Survey	EUN	1.2 km	MPC · JPL
457208	2008 JK_{20}	—	April 7, 2008	Mount Lemmon	Mount Lemmon Survey	·	3.8 km	MPC · JPL
457209	2008 JR_{21}	—	May 5, 2008	Kitt Peak	Spacewatch	·	1.8 km	MPC · JPL
457210	2008 JY_{22}	—	March 29, 2008	Kitt Peak	Spacewatch	·	1.2 km	MPC · JPL
457211	2008 JD_{26}	—	November 29, 2005	Mount Lemmon	Mount Lemmon Survey	·	3.0 km	MPC · JPL
457212	2008 JR_{26}	—	May 13, 2008	Socorro	LINEAR	AMO	380 m	MPC · JPL
457213	2008 JG_{29}	—	May 12, 2008	Kitt Peak	Spacewatch	·	1.6 km	MPC · JPL
457214	2008 JK_{30}	—	May 11, 2008	Kitt Peak	Spacewatch	·	1.1 km	MPC · JPL
457215	2008 JS_{33}	—	April 6, 2008	Mount Lemmon	Mount Lemmon Survey	JUN	1.0 km	MPC · JPL
457216	2008 JM_{36}	—	May 3, 2008	Kitt Peak	Spacewatch	·	1.5 km	MPC · JPL
457217	2008 KE_{2}	—	May 3, 2008	Mount Lemmon	Mount Lemmon Survey	·	2.2 km	MPC · JPL
457218	2008 KC_{4}	—	May 27, 2008	Kitt Peak	Spacewatch	·	1.2 km	MPC · JPL
457219	2008 KM_{6}	—	May 4, 2008	Kitt Peak	Spacewatch	·	3.5 km	MPC · JPL
457220	2008 KY_{6}	—	May 26, 2008	Kitt Peak	Spacewatch	·	1.8 km	MPC · JPL
457221	2008 KZ_{8}	—	April 1, 2008	Kitt Peak	Spacewatch	L5	8.3 km	MPC · JPL
457222	2008 KG_{14}	—	May 27, 2008	Kitt Peak	Spacewatch	·	1.8 km	MPC · JPL
457223	2008 KM_{17}	—	May 28, 2008	Kitt Peak	Spacewatch	·	1.2 km	MPC · JPL
457224	2008 KM_{18}	—	April 16, 2008	Mount Lemmon	Mount Lemmon Survey	·	1.7 km	MPC · JPL
457225	2008 KN_{18}	—	May 2, 2008	Kitt Peak	Spacewatch	JUN	990 m	MPC · JPL
457226	2008 KK_{23}	—	May 28, 2008	Kitt Peak	Spacewatch	·	1.7 km	MPC · JPL
457227	2008 KY_{29}	—	May 29, 2008	Kitt Peak	Spacewatch	·	1.3 km	MPC · JPL
457228	2008 KM_{33}	—	April 13, 2008	Mount Lemmon	Mount Lemmon Survey	·	1.3 km	MPC · JPL
457229	2008 KB_{40}	—	May 13, 2008	Mount Lemmon	Mount Lemmon Survey	·	1.6 km	MPC · JPL
457230	2008 KU_{40}	—	March 29, 2008	Kitt Peak	Spacewatch	NEM	2.1 km	MPC · JPL
457231	2008 KM_{41}	—	May 3, 2008	Mount Lemmon	Mount Lemmon Survey	·	1.4 km	MPC · JPL
457232	2008 KF_{43}	—	May 30, 2008	Mount Lemmon	Mount Lemmon Survey	·	2.2 km	MPC · JPL
457233	2008 KH_{43}	—	May 27, 2008	Mount Lemmon	Mount Lemmon Survey	·	1.9 km	MPC · JPL
457234	2008 LC_{7}	—	April 30, 2008	Mount Lemmon	Mount Lemmon Survey	·	1.5 km	MPC · JPL
457235	2008 LT_{8}	—	June 7, 2008	Kitt Peak	Spacewatch	·	2.9 km	MPC · JPL
457236	2008 LO_{9}	—	May 2, 2008	Kitt Peak	Spacewatch	·	1.2 km	MPC · JPL
457237	2008 LJ_{14}	—	June 8, 2008	Kitt Peak	Spacewatch	·	1.5 km	MPC · JPL
457238	2008 LN_{14}	—	April 27, 2008	Mount Lemmon	Mount Lemmon Survey	·	1.6 km	MPC · JPL
457239	2008 NU_{4}	—	July 6, 2008	Charleston	Astronomical Research Observatory	·	2.3 km	MPC · JPL
457240	2008 OT_{6}	—	July 26, 2008	Siding Spring	SSS	·	3.0 km	MPC · JPL
457241	2008 OY_{8}	—	July 29, 2008	Mount Lemmon	Mount Lemmon Survey	·	2.6 km	MPC · JPL
457242	2008 OC_{19}	—	September 28, 2003	Socorro	LINEAR	·	3.2 km	MPC · JPL
457243	2008 OC_{21}	—	July 29, 2008	Kitt Peak	Spacewatch	·	3.3 km	MPC · JPL
457244	2008 OT_{21}	—	July 30, 2008	Kitt Peak	Spacewatch	·	2.5 km	MPC · JPL
457245	2008 OH_{22}	—	July 30, 2008	Kitt Peak	Spacewatch	HYG	2.5 km	MPC · JPL
457246	2008 PV_{1}	—	August 1, 2008	La Sagra	OAM	·	2.2 km	MPC · JPL
457247	2008 PF_{3}	—	July 31, 2008	Mount Lemmon	Mount Lemmon Survey	·	3.6 km	MPC · JPL
457248 Hondius	2008 QH	Hondius	August 20, 2008	Vallemare Borbona	V. S. Casulli	·	3.2 km	MPC · JPL
457249	2008 QR_{8}	—	June 8, 2008	Kitt Peak	Spacewatch	·	3.8 km	MPC · JPL
457250	2008 QD_{12}	—	July 31, 2008	Kitt Peak	Spacewatch	·	3.2 km	MPC · JPL
457251	2008 QC_{15}	—	August 26, 2008	Dauban	Kugel, F.	·	2.6 km	MPC · JPL
457252	2008 QQ_{28}	—	August 31, 2008	La Sagra	OAM	·	680 m	MPC · JPL
457253	2008 QS_{31}	—	August 30, 2008	Socorro	LINEAR	·	3.4 km	MPC · JPL
457254	2008 QL_{35}	—	August 25, 2008	Siding Spring	SSS	T_{j} (2.97)	5.2 km	MPC · JPL
457255	2008 QQ_{47}	—	August 24, 2008	Kitt Peak	Spacewatch	·	3.9 km	MPC · JPL
457256	2008 RO_{4}	—	September 2, 2008	Kitt Peak	Spacewatch	EMA	3.3 km	MPC · JPL
457257	2008 RR_{8}	—	September 3, 2008	Kitt Peak	Spacewatch	·	540 m	MPC · JPL
457258	2008 RU_{12}	—	August 20, 2008	Kitt Peak	Spacewatch	·	2.2 km	MPC · JPL
457259	2008 RV_{15}	—	September 4, 2008	Kitt Peak	Spacewatch	HYG	2.3 km	MPC · JPL
457260	2008 RY_{24}	—	September 7, 2008	Catalina	CSS	AMO +1km	940 m	MPC · JPL
457261	2008 RY_{25}	—	September 7, 2008	Mount Lemmon	Mount Lemmon Survey	·	1.8 km	MPC · JPL
457262	2008 RO_{32}	—	September 2, 2008	Kitt Peak	Spacewatch	·	2.6 km	MPC · JPL
457263	2008 RX_{32}	—	September 2, 2008	Kitt Peak	Spacewatch	TRE	2.1 km	MPC · JPL
457264	2008 RT_{33}	—	September 2, 2008	Kitt Peak	Spacewatch	(45637) · CYB	3.8 km	MPC · JPL
457265	2008 RU_{39}	—	September 2, 2008	Kitt Peak	Spacewatch	EOS	1.7 km	MPC · JPL
457266	2008 RL_{41}	—	September 2, 2008	Kitt Peak	Spacewatch	·	470 m	MPC · JPL
457267	2008 RP_{41}	—	September 2, 2008	Kitt Peak	Spacewatch	·	2.9 km	MPC · JPL
457268	2008 RS_{42}	—	September 2, 2008	Kitt Peak	Spacewatch	VER	2.3 km	MPC · JPL
457269	2008 RC_{45}	—	September 2, 2008	Kitt Peak	Spacewatch	·	510 m	MPC · JPL
457270	2008 RA_{46}	—	September 2, 2008	Kitt Peak	Spacewatch	·	690 m	MPC · JPL
457271	2008 RG_{54}	—	July 29, 2008	Mount Lemmon	Mount Lemmon Survey	EOS	1.7 km	MPC · JPL
457272	2008 RZ_{55}	—	July 29, 2008	Mount Lemmon	Mount Lemmon Survey	EOS	1.8 km	MPC · JPL
457273	2008 RE_{64}	—	September 4, 2008	Kitt Peak	Spacewatch	·	610 m	MPC · JPL
457274	2008 RA_{76}	—	September 6, 2008	Mount Lemmon	Mount Lemmon Survey	·	3.5 km	MPC · JPL
457275	2008 RK_{78}	—	September 10, 2008	Wrightwood	J. W. Young	·	630 m	MPC · JPL
457276	2008 RP_{80}	—	August 24, 2008	Kitt Peak	Spacewatch	·	2.2 km	MPC · JPL
457277	2008 RZ_{83}	—	July 29, 2008	Kitt Peak	Spacewatch	·	2.8 km	MPC · JPL
457278	2008 RN_{86}	—	September 5, 2008	Kitt Peak	Spacewatch	·	2.5 km	MPC · JPL
457279	2008 RQ_{86}	—	September 5, 2008	Kitt Peak	Spacewatch	·	2.2 km	MPC · JPL
457280	2008 RR_{86}	—	September 5, 2008	Kitt Peak	Spacewatch	EOS	1.8 km	MPC · JPL
457281	2008 RS_{86}	—	September 5, 2008	Kitt Peak	Spacewatch	EOS	1.5 km	MPC · JPL
457282	2008 RZ_{99}	—	September 2, 2008	Kitt Peak	Spacewatch	·	3.1 km	MPC · JPL
457283	2008 RQ_{103}	—	September 5, 2008	Kitt Peak	Spacewatch	URS	3.1 km	MPC · JPL
457284	2008 RK_{105}	—	September 6, 2008	Mount Lemmon	Mount Lemmon Survey	·	3.2 km	MPC · JPL
457285	2008 RK_{111}	—	September 4, 2008	Kitt Peak	Spacewatch	EOS	2.1 km	MPC · JPL
457286	2008 RM_{112}	—	September 5, 2008	Kitt Peak	Spacewatch	·	2.9 km	MPC · JPL
457287	2008 RU_{113}	—	September 6, 2008	Kitt Peak	Spacewatch	HYG	2.3 km	MPC · JPL
457288	2008 RL_{118}	—	September 9, 2008	Mount Lemmon	Mount Lemmon Survey	·	2.7 km	MPC · JPL
457289	2008 RU_{125}	—	September 9, 2008	Mount Lemmon	Mount Lemmon Survey	EOS	2.0 km	MPC · JPL
457290	2008 RU_{128}	—	September 7, 2008	Mount Lemmon	Mount Lemmon Survey	·	530 m	MPC · JPL
457291	2008 RA_{129}	—	September 5, 2008	Socorro	LINEAR	·	2.6 km	MPC · JPL
457292	2008 RY_{131}	—	September 6, 2008	Catalina	CSS	·	4.3 km	MPC · JPL
457293	2008 RK_{135}	—	September 3, 2008	Kitt Peak	Spacewatch	·	770 m	MPC · JPL
457294	2008 RW_{137}	—	September 5, 2008	Kitt Peak	Spacewatch	·	2.9 km	MPC · JPL
457295	2008 RX_{138}	—	September 6, 2008	Catalina	CSS	·	3.0 km	MPC · JPL
457296	2008 RL_{140}	—	September 9, 2008	Catalina	CSS	EOS	2.3 km	MPC · JPL
457297	2008 RT_{140}	—	September 9, 2008	Kitt Peak	Spacewatch	·	2.5 km	MPC · JPL
457298	2008 RN_{142}	—	September 7, 2008	Socorro	LINEAR	·	3.8 km	MPC · JPL
457299	2008 RP_{142}	—	September 7, 2008	Socorro	LINEAR	·	3.6 km	MPC · JPL
457300	2008 RV_{142}	—	September 2, 2008	Kitt Peak	Spacewatch	·	2.6 km	MPC · JPL

== 457301–457400 ==
back to top

Designation			Discovery			Properties		Ref
Permanent	Provisional	Named after	Date	Site	Discoverer(s)	Category	Diam.	Ref
457301	2008 RG_{143}	—	September 3, 2008	Kitt Peak	Spacewatch	·	2.3 km	MPC · JPL
457302	2008 RL_{143}	—	September 4, 2008	Kitt Peak	Spacewatch	·	600 m	MPC · JPL
457303 Daina	2008 SC_{8}	Daina	September 23, 2008	Moletai	K. Černis, J. Zdanavičius	·	570 m	MPC · JPL
457304	2008 SS_{23}	—	September 6, 2008	Mount Lemmon	Mount Lemmon Survey	·	3.0 km	MPC · JPL
457305	2008 SV_{32}	—	September 20, 2008	Kitt Peak	Spacewatch	·	3.7 km	MPC · JPL
457306	2008 SN_{34}	—	September 6, 2008	Mount Lemmon	Mount Lemmon Survey	·	2.5 km	MPC · JPL
457307	2008 SV_{34}	—	September 20, 2008	Kitt Peak	Spacewatch	·	3.5 km	MPC · JPL
457308	2008 SK_{36}	—	September 20, 2008	Kitt Peak	Spacewatch	·	2.5 km	MPC · JPL
457309	2008 SN_{42}	—	September 7, 2008	Mount Lemmon	Mount Lemmon Survey	·	2.7 km	MPC · JPL
457310	2008 SQ_{50}	—	September 10, 2008	Kitt Peak	Spacewatch	EOS	1.5 km	MPC · JPL
457311	2008 SO_{54}	—	September 20, 2008	Mount Lemmon	Mount Lemmon Survey	·	3.1 km	MPC · JPL
457312	2008 SE_{61}	—	September 3, 2008	Kitt Peak	Spacewatch	·	2.7 km	MPC · JPL
457313	2008 SM_{65}	—	September 21, 2008	Mount Lemmon	Mount Lemmon Survey	·	700 m	MPC · JPL
457314	2008 ST_{65}	—	September 21, 2008	Mount Lemmon	Mount Lemmon Survey	·	3.2 km	MPC · JPL
457315	2008 SY_{79}	—	September 3, 2008	Kitt Peak	Spacewatch	·	2.3 km	MPC · JPL
457316	2008 SL_{82}	—	September 22, 2008	Calvin-Rehoboth	L. A. Molnar	·	2.5 km	MPC · JPL
457317	2008 ST_{89}	—	September 21, 2008	Mount Lemmon	Mount Lemmon Survey	·	3.2 km	MPC · JPL
457318	2008 SU_{89}	—	September 21, 2008	Kitt Peak	Spacewatch	·	2.7 km	MPC · JPL
457319	2008 SV_{95}	—	September 21, 2008	Kitt Peak	Spacewatch	·	2.1 km	MPC · JPL
457320	2008 ST_{100}	—	September 21, 2008	Kitt Peak	Spacewatch	·	690 m	MPC · JPL
457321	2008 SC_{101}	—	September 21, 2008	Kitt Peak	Spacewatch	·	740 m	MPC · JPL
457322	2008 SB_{115}	—	September 22, 2008	Kitt Peak	Spacewatch	(2076)	750 m	MPC · JPL
457323	2008 SW_{131}	—	September 22, 2008	Kitt Peak	Spacewatch	HYG	2.6 km	MPC · JPL
457324	2008 SO_{138}	—	September 23, 2008	Mount Lemmon	Mount Lemmon Survey	·	650 m	MPC · JPL
457325	2008 SB_{142}	—	September 24, 2008	Mount Lemmon	Mount Lemmon Survey	·	760 m	MPC · JPL
457326	2008 SJ_{146}	—	September 5, 2008	Kitt Peak	Spacewatch	EOS	1.7 km	MPC · JPL
457327	2008 SX_{161}	—	August 23, 2008	Kitt Peak	Spacewatch	·	610 m	MPC · JPL
457328	2008 SD_{162}	—	September 28, 2008	Socorro	LINEAR	·	3.6 km	MPC · JPL
457329	2008 SA_{166}	—	September 3, 2008	Kitt Peak	Spacewatch	EOS	1.8 km	MPC · JPL
457330	2008 SQ_{168}	—	September 6, 2008	Kitt Peak	Spacewatch	·	2.8 km	MPC · JPL
457331	2008 SC_{172}	—	September 3, 2008	Kitt Peak	Spacewatch	·	2.8 km	MPC · JPL
457332	2008 SE_{174}	—	September 22, 2008	Kitt Peak	Spacewatch	·	4.8 km	MPC · JPL
457333	2008 SW_{179}	—	September 24, 2008	Kitt Peak	Spacewatch	·	2.3 km	MPC · JPL
457334	2008 SP_{181}	—	September 24, 2008	Kitt Peak	Spacewatch	·	460 m	MPC · JPL
457335	2008 SA_{190}	—	September 25, 2008	Kitt Peak	Spacewatch	·	2.5 km	MPC · JPL
457336	2008 SY_{194}	—	September 6, 2008	Mount Lemmon	Mount Lemmon Survey	·	710 m	MPC · JPL
457337	2008 SZ_{194}	—	September 25, 2008	Kitt Peak	Spacewatch	·	600 m	MPC · JPL
457338	2008 SG_{203}	—	April 24, 2003	Kitt Peak	Spacewatch	·	1.3 km	MPC · JPL
457339	2008 SS_{203}	—	September 26, 2008	Kitt Peak	Spacewatch	CYB	2.6 km	MPC · JPL
457340	2008 SU_{207}	—	September 27, 2008	Catalina	CSS	·	3.9 km	MPC · JPL
457341	2008 SD_{215}	—	September 6, 2008	Kitt Peak	Spacewatch	·	2.2 km	MPC · JPL
457342	2008 SK_{215}	—	September 6, 2008	Kitt Peak	Spacewatch	VER	2.0 km	MPC · JPL
457343	2008 SY_{218}	—	September 5, 2008	Kitt Peak	Spacewatch	·	2.9 km	MPC · JPL
457344	2008 SA_{220}	—	September 4, 2008	Kitt Peak	Spacewatch	·	2.3 km	MPC · JPL
457345	2008 SP_{222}	—	September 25, 2008	Mount Lemmon	Mount Lemmon Survey	·	2.3 km	MPC · JPL
457346	2008 SZ_{222}	—	September 25, 2008	Mount Lemmon	Mount Lemmon Survey	·	2.1 km	MPC · JPL
457347	2008 SA_{223}	—	September 25, 2008	Mount Lemmon	Mount Lemmon Survey	·	610 m	MPC · JPL
457348	2008 SY_{225}	—	September 26, 2008	Kitt Peak	Spacewatch	·	3.0 km	MPC · JPL
457349	2008 SD_{234}	—	September 28, 2008	Mount Lemmon	Mount Lemmon Survey	·	2.2 km	MPC · JPL
457350	2008 SF_{237}	—	September 20, 2008	Mount Lemmon	Mount Lemmon Survey	·	2.1 km	MPC · JPL
457351	2008 SC_{250}	—	September 23, 2008	Mount Lemmon	Mount Lemmon Survey	EOS	1.6 km	MPC · JPL
457352	2008 SG_{257}	—	September 22, 2008	Mount Lemmon	Mount Lemmon Survey	·	2.7 km	MPC · JPL
457353	2008 SA_{258}	—	September 22, 2008	Mount Lemmon	Mount Lemmon Survey	·	2.3 km	MPC · JPL
457354	2008 SQ_{259}	—	September 23, 2008	Mount Lemmon	Mount Lemmon Survey	·	590 m	MPC · JPL
457355	2008 SC_{262}	—	September 24, 2008	Kitt Peak	Spacewatch	THM	2.1 km	MPC · JPL
457356	2008 SV_{263}	—	September 24, 2008	Kitt Peak	Spacewatch	·	2.3 km	MPC · JPL
457357	2008 SA_{265}	—	September 26, 2008	Kitt Peak	Spacewatch	·	2.9 km	MPC · JPL
457358	2008 SC_{267}	—	September 22, 2008	Catalina	CSS	·	4.1 km	MPC · JPL
457359	2008 SM_{267}	—	September 23, 2008	Kitt Peak	Spacewatch	·	700 m	MPC · JPL
457360	2008 SN_{269}	—	September 22, 2008	Mount Lemmon	Mount Lemmon Survey	·	2.8 km	MPC · JPL
457361	2008 SX_{269}	—	September 23, 2008	Kitt Peak	Spacewatch	·	2.6 km	MPC · JPL
457362	2008 SJ_{271}	—	September 29, 2008	Kitt Peak	Spacewatch	·	2.9 km	MPC · JPL
457363	2008 SY_{288}	—	September 24, 2008	Kitt Peak	Spacewatch	·	680 m	MPC · JPL
457364	2008 SZ_{288}	—	September 25, 2008	Kitt Peak	Spacewatch	·	4.0 km	MPC · JPL
457365	2008 SU_{289}	—	September 27, 2008	Mount Lemmon	Mount Lemmon Survey	·	680 m	MPC · JPL
457366	2008 SV_{290}	—	September 23, 2008	Kitt Peak	Spacewatch	·	2.3 km	MPC · JPL
457367	2008 SY_{291}	—	September 24, 2008	Catalina	CSS	·	640 m	MPC · JPL
457368	2008 SC_{301}	—	September 23, 2008	Catalina	CSS	·	3.1 km	MPC · JPL
457369	2008 SU_{303}	—	September 24, 2008	Catalina	CSS	JUN	1.3 km	MPC · JPL
457370	2008 SA_{307}	—	September 29, 2008	Socorro	LINEAR	·	680 m	MPC · JPL
457371	2008 TR_{11}	—	September 29, 2008	Catalina	CSS	·	650 m	MPC · JPL
457372	2008 TU_{16}	—	October 1, 2008	Catalina	CSS	·	680 m	MPC · JPL
457373	2008 TZ_{20}	—	October 1, 2008	Mount Lemmon	Mount Lemmon Survey	·	520 m	MPC · JPL
457374	2008 TE_{24}	—	October 2, 2008	Kitt Peak	Spacewatch	·	500 m	MPC · JPL
457375	2008 TJ_{24}	—	September 8, 2008	Mount Lemmon	Mount Lemmon Survey	HYG	2.6 km	MPC · JPL
457376	2008 TO_{29}	—	September 19, 2008	Kitt Peak	Spacewatch	·	610 m	MPC · JPL
457377	2008 TR_{29}	—	October 1, 2008	Mount Lemmon	Mount Lemmon Survey	HYG	3.0 km	MPC · JPL
457378	2008 TD_{32}	—	October 1, 2008	Kitt Peak	Spacewatch	·	2.4 km	MPC · JPL
457379	2008 TK_{34}	—	October 1, 2008	Kitt Peak	Spacewatch	URS	2.7 km	MPC · JPL
457380	2008 TJ_{39}	—	October 1, 2008	Kitt Peak	Spacewatch	·	560 m	MPC · JPL
457381	2008 TG_{40}	—	October 1, 2008	Mount Lemmon	Mount Lemmon Survey	·	2.8 km	MPC · JPL
457382	2008 TW_{43}	—	October 1, 2008	Mount Lemmon	Mount Lemmon Survey	·	2.7 km	MPC · JPL
457383	2008 TC_{44}	—	September 22, 2008	Mount Lemmon	Mount Lemmon Survey	CYB	2.2 km	MPC · JPL
457384	2008 TK_{44}	—	October 1, 2008	Mount Lemmon	Mount Lemmon Survey	·	530 m	MPC · JPL
457385	2008 TX_{49}	—	September 24, 2008	Kitt Peak	Spacewatch	·	2.0 km	MPC · JPL
457386	2008 TT_{52}	—	October 2, 2008	Kitt Peak	Spacewatch	·	2.1 km	MPC · JPL
457387	2008 TV_{53}	—	September 24, 2008	Kitt Peak	Spacewatch	·	2.5 km	MPC · JPL
457388	2008 TZ_{56}	—	September 24, 2008	Kitt Peak	Spacewatch	·	2.3 km	MPC · JPL
457389	2008 TV_{58}	—	October 2, 2008	Kitt Peak	Spacewatch	·	2.5 km	MPC · JPL
457390	2008 TR_{60}	—	October 2, 2008	Kitt Peak	Spacewatch	·	2.2 km	MPC · JPL
457391	2008 TW_{63}	—	October 2, 2008	Kitt Peak	Spacewatch	·	2.4 km	MPC · JPL
457392	2008 TX_{63}	—	October 2, 2008	Kitt Peak	Spacewatch	·	500 m	MPC · JPL
457393	2008 TB_{68}	—	October 2, 2008	Kitt Peak	Spacewatch	VER	2.4 km	MPC · JPL
457394	2008 TS_{70}	—	October 2, 2008	Kitt Peak	Spacewatch	·	630 m	MPC · JPL
457395	2008 TA_{73}	—	October 2, 2008	Kitt Peak	Spacewatch	·	3.7 km	MPC · JPL
457396	2008 TA_{75}	—	September 22, 2008	Mount Lemmon	Mount Lemmon Survey	·	2.7 km	MPC · JPL
457397	2008 TU_{76}	—	October 2, 2008	Mount Lemmon	Mount Lemmon Survey	·	510 m	MPC · JPL
457398	2008 TJ_{90}	—	October 3, 2008	Kitt Peak	Spacewatch	·	550 m	MPC · JPL
457399	2008 TA_{97}	—	September 4, 2008	Kitt Peak	Spacewatch	·	690 m	MPC · JPL
457400	2008 TG_{100}	—	September 6, 2008	Mount Lemmon	Mount Lemmon Survey	·	2.3 km	MPC · JPL

== 457401–457500 ==
back to top

Designation			Discovery			Properties		Ref
Permanent	Provisional	Named after	Date	Site	Discoverer(s)	Category	Diam.	Ref
457401	2008 TS_{104}	—	October 6, 2008	Catalina	CSS	·	2.6 km	MPC · JPL
457402	2008 TQ_{108}	—	October 6, 2008	Mount Lemmon	Mount Lemmon Survey	·	2.9 km	MPC · JPL
457403	2008 TU_{115}	—	September 23, 2008	Catalina	CSS	·	820 m	MPC · JPL
457404	2008 TK_{122}	—	September 23, 2008	Kitt Peak	Spacewatch	·	720 m	MPC · JPL
457405	2008 TP_{122}	—	October 7, 2008	Kitt Peak	Spacewatch	VER	3.1 km	MPC · JPL
457406	2008 TD_{124}	—	October 8, 2008	Mount Lemmon	Mount Lemmon Survey	·	4.3 km	MPC · JPL
457407	2008 TB_{126}	—	September 23, 2008	Kitt Peak	Spacewatch	·	2.4 km	MPC · JPL
457408	2008 TR_{130}	—	October 8, 2008	Mount Lemmon	Mount Lemmon Survey	·	630 m	MPC · JPL
457409	2008 TH_{136}	—	September 7, 2008	Mount Lemmon	Mount Lemmon Survey	·	610 m	MPC · JPL
457410	2008 TK_{148}	—	September 23, 2008	Mount Lemmon	Mount Lemmon Survey	·	2.3 km	MPC · JPL
457411	2008 TN_{148}	—	October 9, 2008	Mount Lemmon	Mount Lemmon Survey	·	2.6 km	MPC · JPL
457412	2008 TA_{155}	—	October 9, 2008	Mount Lemmon	Mount Lemmon Survey	·	2.4 km	MPC · JPL
457413	2008 TG_{160}	—	October 1, 2008	Kitt Peak	Spacewatch	·	2.6 km	MPC · JPL
457414	2008 TE_{163}	—	October 1, 2008	Catalina	CSS	THB	2.8 km	MPC · JPL
457415	2008 TQ_{163}	—	October 1, 2008	Kitt Peak	Spacewatch	HYG	2.2 km	MPC · JPL
457416	2008 TM_{170}	—	October 9, 2008	Kitt Peak	Spacewatch	·	670 m	MPC · JPL
457417	2008 TU_{177}	—	October 8, 2008	Catalina	CSS	·	3.3 km	MPC · JPL
457418	2008 TV_{180}	—	October 6, 2008	Catalina	CSS	·	4.1 km	MPC · JPL
457419	2008 TU_{184}	—	October 6, 2008	Kitt Peak	Spacewatch	EOS	1.8 km	MPC · JPL
457420	2008 TP_{185}	—	October 6, 2008	Mount Lemmon	Mount Lemmon Survey	·	3.3 km	MPC · JPL
457421	2008 UH_{8}	—	September 5, 2008	Kitt Peak	Spacewatch	·	2.8 km	MPC · JPL
457422	2008 UX_{13}	—	September 23, 2008	Kitt Peak	Spacewatch	·	2.7 km	MPC · JPL
457423	2008 UR_{17}	—	October 2, 2008	Kitt Peak	Spacewatch	·	2.7 km	MPC · JPL
457424	2008 UB_{23}	—	September 20, 2008	Kitt Peak	Spacewatch	·	630 m	MPC · JPL
457425	2008 UA_{28}	—	October 20, 2008	Kitt Peak	Spacewatch	·	680 m	MPC · JPL
457426	2008 UU_{32}	—	October 6, 2008	Mount Lemmon	Mount Lemmon Survey	EOS	2.0 km	MPC · JPL
457427	2008 UC_{34}	—	October 20, 2008	Kitt Peak	Spacewatch	·	2.5 km	MPC · JPL
457428	2008 US_{37}	—	October 20, 2008	Kitt Peak	Spacewatch	VER	2.9 km	MPC · JPL
457429	2008 UA_{40}	—	September 25, 2008	Mount Lemmon	Mount Lemmon Survey	·	560 m	MPC · JPL
457430	2008 UE_{49}	—	September 24, 2008	Mount Lemmon	Mount Lemmon Survey	·	570 m	MPC · JPL
457431	2008 UL_{53}	—	October 20, 2008	Kitt Peak	Spacewatch	·	600 m	MPC · JPL
457432	2008 UH_{69}	—	October 21, 2008	Mount Lemmon	Mount Lemmon Survey	·	2.2 km	MPC · JPL
457433	2008 UT_{76}	—	October 21, 2008	Kitt Peak	Spacewatch	EOS	2.1 km	MPC · JPL
457434	2008 UN_{78}	—	October 21, 2008	Lulin	LUSS	EOS	2.3 km	MPC · JPL
457435	2008 US_{79}	—	October 8, 2008	Mount Lemmon	Mount Lemmon Survey	·	2.9 km	MPC · JPL
457436	2008 UC_{80}	—	October 22, 2008	Kitt Peak	Spacewatch	·	2.5 km	MPC · JPL
457437	2008 UK_{102}	—	October 20, 2008	Kitt Peak	Spacewatch	·	450 m	MPC · JPL
457438	2008 UP_{105}	—	October 20, 2008	Kitt Peak	Spacewatch	·	590 m	MPC · JPL
457439	2008 UB_{110}	—	October 22, 2008	Kitt Peak	Spacewatch	·	730 m	MPC · JPL
457440	2008 UX_{116}	—	September 29, 2008	Mount Lemmon	Mount Lemmon Survey	·	2.7 km	MPC · JPL
457441	2008 UV_{117}	—	October 22, 2008	Kitt Peak	Spacewatch	·	530 m	MPC · JPL
457442	2008 UU_{121}	—	October 22, 2008	Kitt Peak	Spacewatch	VER	3.3 km	MPC · JPL
457443	2008 UM_{122}	—	October 22, 2008	Kitt Peak	Spacewatch	·	3.4 km	MPC · JPL
457444	2008 UW_{125}	—	October 22, 2008	Kitt Peak	Spacewatch	·	630 m	MPC · JPL
457445	2008 UU_{126}	—	October 22, 2008	Mount Lemmon	Mount Lemmon Survey	·	770 m	MPC · JPL
457446	2008 UL_{129}	—	October 23, 2008	Kitt Peak	Spacewatch	·	510 m	MPC · JPL
457447	2008 UV_{129}	—	October 23, 2008	Kitt Peak	Spacewatch	·	2.4 km	MPC · JPL
457448	2008 UE_{131}	—	October 9, 2008	Kitt Peak	Spacewatch	·	440 m	MPC · JPL
457449	2008 UE_{143}	—	October 23, 2008	Kitt Peak	Spacewatch	·	2.9 km	MPC · JPL
457450	2008 UU_{150}	—	October 2, 2008	Kitt Peak	Spacewatch	·	2.9 km	MPC · JPL
457451	2008 UC_{152}	—	September 23, 2008	Kitt Peak	Spacewatch	THM	1.9 km	MPC · JPL
457452	2008 UL_{154}	—	September 22, 2008	Kitt Peak	Spacewatch	·	620 m	MPC · JPL
457453	2008 UT_{156}	—	October 23, 2008	Mount Lemmon	Mount Lemmon Survey	·	2.6 km	MPC · JPL
457454	2008 UP_{159}	—	August 24, 2007	Kitt Peak	Spacewatch	·	3.4 km	MPC · JPL
457455	2008 UK_{164}	—	October 8, 2008	Mount Lemmon	Mount Lemmon Survey	·	2.9 km	MPC · JPL
457456	2008 UU_{167}	—	October 24, 2008	Kitt Peak	Spacewatch	THM	2.2 km	MPC · JPL
457457	2008 UE_{168}	—	October 24, 2008	Kitt Peak	Spacewatch	EOS	1.8 km	MPC · JPL
457458	2008 UF_{168}	—	October 24, 2008	Kitt Peak	Spacewatch	LIX	3.2 km	MPC · JPL
457459	2008 UU_{174}	—	October 24, 2008	Catalina	CSS	·	3.3 km	MPC · JPL
457460	2008 UZ_{177}	—	October 24, 2008	Mount Lemmon	Mount Lemmon Survey	·	640 m	MPC · JPL
457461	2008 UD_{181}	—	October 24, 2008	Mount Lemmon	Mount Lemmon Survey	VER	2.7 km	MPC · JPL
457462	2008 UZ_{182}	—	October 24, 2008	Mount Lemmon	Mount Lemmon Survey	·	650 m	MPC · JPL
457463	2008 UO_{187}	—	October 24, 2008	Kitt Peak	Spacewatch	V	490 m	MPC · JPL
457464	2008 UA_{207}	—	October 23, 2008	Kitt Peak	Spacewatch	·	2.8 km	MPC · JPL
457465	2008 UO_{210}	—	September 23, 2008	Mount Lemmon	Mount Lemmon Survey	·	3.1 km	MPC · JPL
457466	2008 UZ_{213}	—	September 29, 2008	Mount Lemmon	Mount Lemmon Survey	·	2.2 km	MPC · JPL
457467	2008 UO_{216}	—	October 24, 2008	Kitt Peak	Spacewatch	V	510 m	MPC · JPL
457468	2008 UY_{218}	—	September 23, 2008	Mount Lemmon	Mount Lemmon Survey	VER	2.8 km	MPC · JPL
457469	2008 UF_{221}	—	October 25, 2008	Kitt Peak	Spacewatch	·	560 m	MPC · JPL
457470	2008 UQ_{221}	—	October 25, 2008	Kitt Peak	Spacewatch	·	770 m	MPC · JPL
457471	2008 UX_{221}	—	October 25, 2008	Kitt Peak	Spacewatch	·	3.7 km	MPC · JPL
457472	2008 UY_{229}	—	October 25, 2008	Kitt Peak	Spacewatch	·	720 m	MPC · JPL
457473	2008 UO_{232}	—	October 26, 2008	Kitt Peak	Spacewatch	·	2.5 km	MPC · JPL
457474	2008 UC_{234}	—	September 24, 2008	Mount Lemmon	Mount Lemmon Survey	·	2.6 km	MPC · JPL
457475	2008 UB_{239}	—	October 26, 2008	Catalina	CSS	·	3.9 km	MPC · JPL
457476	2008 UX_{240}	—	October 26, 2008	Kitt Peak	Spacewatch	·	750 m	MPC · JPL
457477	2008 UP_{247}	—	October 26, 2008	Kitt Peak	Spacewatch	·	630 m	MPC · JPL
457478	2008 UR_{252}	—	October 27, 2008	Kitt Peak	Spacewatch	·	2.8 km	MPC · JPL
457479	2008 UL_{269}	—	September 26, 2008	Kitt Peak	Spacewatch	·	3.0 km	MPC · JPL
457480	2008 UL_{286}	—	September 23, 2008	Kitt Peak	Spacewatch	·	2.7 km	MPC · JPL
457481	2008 UT_{289}	—	October 28, 2008	Kitt Peak	Spacewatch	·	770 m	MPC · JPL
457482	2008 UN_{292}	—	September 23, 2008	Mount Lemmon	Mount Lemmon Survey	·	2.6 km	MPC · JPL
457483	2008 US_{294}	—	September 6, 2008	Mount Lemmon	Mount Lemmon Survey	·	620 m	MPC · JPL
457484	2008 UF_{303}	—	October 29, 2008	Kitt Peak	Spacewatch	·	4.3 km	MPC · JPL
457485	2008 UD_{315}	—	October 3, 2008	Mount Lemmon	Mount Lemmon Survey	·	830 m	MPC · JPL
457486	2008 UM_{315}	—	September 29, 2008	Mount Lemmon	Mount Lemmon Survey	·	3.2 km	MPC · JPL
457487	2008 UY_{315}	—	October 30, 2008	Kitt Peak	Spacewatch	·	540 m	MPC · JPL
457488	2008 UK_{324}	—	October 31, 2008	Mount Lemmon	Mount Lemmon Survey	·	590 m	MPC · JPL
457489	2008 UD_{330}	—	September 23, 2008	Mount Lemmon	Mount Lemmon Survey	·	630 m	MPC · JPL
457490	2008 UA_{336}	—	October 20, 2008	Kitt Peak	Spacewatch	·	3.3 km	MPC · JPL
457491	2008 UP_{350}	—	October 23, 2008	Kitt Peak	Spacewatch	EOS	2.2 km	MPC · JPL
457492	2008 UX_{359}	—	October 28, 2008	Kitt Peak	Spacewatch	·	640 m	MPC · JPL
457493	2008 UO_{360}	—	October 28, 2008	Kitt Peak	Spacewatch	VER	4.1 km	MPC · JPL
457494	2008 UM_{362}	—	October 25, 2008	Catalina	CSS	H	540 m	MPC · JPL
457495	2008 UD_{367}	—	October 24, 2008	Socorro	LINEAR	·	620 m	MPC · JPL
457496	2008 UQ_{367}	—	October 25, 2008	Mount Lemmon	Mount Lemmon Survey	·	3.8 km	MPC · JPL
457497	2008 UN_{369}	—	October 28, 2008	Kitt Peak	Spacewatch	·	570 m	MPC · JPL
457498	2008 VP_{2}	—	September 24, 2008	Mount Lemmon	Mount Lemmon Survey	·	720 m	MPC · JPL
457499	2008 VD_{4}	—	November 4, 2008	Bisei SG Center	BATTeRS	·	590 m	MPC · JPL
457500	2008 VH_{11}	—	November 2, 2008	Mount Lemmon	Mount Lemmon Survey	·	620 m	MPC · JPL

== 457501–457600 ==
back to top

Designation			Discovery			Properties		Ref
Permanent	Provisional	Named after	Date	Site	Discoverer(s)	Category	Diam.	Ref
457501	2008 VV_{15}	—	November 1, 2008	Kitt Peak	Spacewatch	·	490 m	MPC · JPL
457502	2008 VV_{22}	—	November 1, 2008	Mount Lemmon	Mount Lemmon Survey	·	780 m	MPC · JPL
457503	2008 VQ_{24}	—	November 1, 2008	Kitt Peak	Spacewatch	·	4.0 km	MPC · JPL
457504	2008 VN_{29}	—	November 2, 2008	Mount Lemmon	Mount Lemmon Survey	·	3.8 km	MPC · JPL
457505	2008 VY_{29}	—	November 2, 2008	Mount Lemmon	Mount Lemmon Survey	VER	2.6 km	MPC · JPL
457506	2008 VM_{36}	—	November 2, 2008	Mount Lemmon	Mount Lemmon Survey	·	730 m	MPC · JPL
457507	2008 VS_{51}	—	November 6, 2008	Kitt Peak	Spacewatch	·	680 m	MPC · JPL
457508	2008 VC_{55}	—	October 10, 2008	Mount Lemmon	Mount Lemmon Survey	HYG	2.3 km	MPC · JPL
457509	2008 VV_{58}	—	January 27, 2006	Mount Lemmon	Mount Lemmon Survey	·	680 m	MPC · JPL
457510	2008 VS_{61}	—	November 8, 2008	Kitt Peak	Spacewatch	·	4.0 km	MPC · JPL
457511	2008 VT_{61}	—	October 23, 2008	Kitt Peak	Spacewatch	EOS	2.2 km	MPC · JPL
457512	2008 VQ_{63}	—	November 8, 2008	Mount Lemmon	Mount Lemmon Survey	·	3.8 km	MPC · JPL
457513	2008 VZ_{65}	—	November 1, 2008	Mount Lemmon	Mount Lemmon Survey	·	620 m	MPC · JPL
457514	2008 VX_{66}	—	November 6, 2008	Mount Lemmon	Mount Lemmon Survey	SYL · CYB	3.7 km	MPC · JPL
457515	2008 VP_{67}	—	October 27, 2008	Kitt Peak	Spacewatch	·	530 m	MPC · JPL
457516	2008 VX_{70}	—	January 7, 2006	Mount Lemmon	Mount Lemmon Survey	·	480 m	MPC · JPL
457517	2008 WK_{3}	—	October 9, 2008	Kitt Peak	Spacewatch	·	3.8 km	MPC · JPL
457518	2008 WE_{4}	—	November 17, 2008	Kitt Peak	Spacewatch	·	4.4 km	MPC · JPL
457519	2008 WE_{7}	—	September 24, 2008	Mount Lemmon	Mount Lemmon Survey	·	600 m	MPC · JPL
457520	2008 WZ_{8}	—	November 17, 2008	Kitt Peak	Spacewatch	·	2.2 km	MPC · JPL
457521	2008 WL_{22}	—	November 18, 2008	Kitt Peak	Spacewatch	·	650 m	MPC · JPL
457522	2008 WP_{22}	—	October 31, 2008	Mount Lemmon	Mount Lemmon Survey	·	2.9 km	MPC · JPL
457523	2008 WK_{34}	—	October 20, 2008	Kitt Peak	Spacewatch	·	600 m	MPC · JPL
457524	2008 WO_{43}	—	November 17, 2008	Kitt Peak	Spacewatch	·	6.4 km	MPC · JPL
457525	2008 WW_{43}	—	October 28, 2008	Kitt Peak	Spacewatch	·	2.9 km	MPC · JPL
457526	2008 WX_{46}	—	November 17, 2008	Kitt Peak	Spacewatch	·	680 m	MPC · JPL
457527	2008 WF_{49}	—	September 7, 2008	Mount Lemmon	Mount Lemmon Survey	·	2.9 km	MPC · JPL
457528	2008 WP_{54}	—	November 19, 2008	Kitt Peak	Spacewatch	·	570 m	MPC · JPL
457529	2008 WE_{55}	—	November 20, 2008	Kitt Peak	Spacewatch	·	730 m	MPC · JPL
457530	2008 WP_{66}	—	October 28, 2008	Kitt Peak	Spacewatch	·	720 m	MPC · JPL
457531	2008 WU_{69}	—	November 18, 2008	Kitt Peak	Spacewatch	·	660 m	MPC · JPL
457532	2008 WT_{77}	—	November 20, 2008	Kitt Peak	Spacewatch	·	550 m	MPC · JPL
457533	2008 WV_{81}	—	November 20, 2008	Kitt Peak	Spacewatch	·	620 m	MPC · JPL
457534	2008 WS_{91}	—	November 8, 2008	Kitt Peak	Spacewatch	·	1 km	MPC · JPL
457535	2008 WV_{99}	—	October 23, 2008	Kitt Peak	Spacewatch	·	3.2 km	MPC · JPL
457536	2008 WG_{107}	—	November 29, 2005	Kitt Peak	Spacewatch	·	640 m	MPC · JPL
457537	2008 WO_{126}	—	November 24, 2008	Mount Lemmon	Mount Lemmon Survey	·	730 m	MPC · JPL
457538	2008 WY_{126}	—	November 30, 2008	Mount Lemmon	Mount Lemmon Survey	·	580 m	MPC · JPL
457539	2008 WG_{134}	—	November 20, 2008	Mount Lemmon	Mount Lemmon Survey	·	810 m	MPC · JPL
457540	2008 WA_{141}	—	November 20, 2008	Kitt Peak	Spacewatch	·	750 m	MPC · JPL
457541	2008 XV	—	September 29, 2005	Catalina	CSS	H	700 m	MPC · JPL
457542	2008 XA_{15}	—	November 19, 2008	Kitt Peak	Spacewatch	·	630 m	MPC · JPL
457543	2008 XL_{34}	—	October 23, 2008	Kitt Peak	Spacewatch	VER	2.8 km	MPC · JPL
457544	2008 XD_{43}	—	April 2, 2006	Kitt Peak	Spacewatch	·	620 m	MPC · JPL
457545	2008 XX_{52}	—	December 4, 2008	Socorro	LINEAR	·	4.0 km	MPC · JPL
457546	2008 YM	—	November 9, 2008	Mount Lemmon	Mount Lemmon Survey	·	800 m	MPC · JPL
457547	2008 YX_{18}	—	October 7, 2004	Kitt Peak	Spacewatch	·	630 m	MPC · JPL
457548	2008 YL_{20}	—	December 21, 2008	Mount Lemmon	Mount Lemmon Survey	NYS	1 km	MPC · JPL
457549	2008 YT_{43}	—	December 4, 2008	Kitt Peak	Spacewatch	·	760 m	MPC · JPL
457550	2008 YN_{53}	—	December 29, 2008	Mount Lemmon	Mount Lemmon Survey	·	610 m	MPC · JPL
457551	2008 YW_{62}	—	December 30, 2008	Mount Lemmon	Mount Lemmon Survey	·	810 m	MPC · JPL
457552	2008 YX_{62}	—	December 30, 2008	Mount Lemmon	Mount Lemmon Survey	·	500 m	MPC · JPL
457553	2008 YL_{64}	—	December 30, 2008	Mount Lemmon	Mount Lemmon Survey	·	740 m	MPC · JPL
457554	2008 YL_{74}	—	December 30, 2008	Kitt Peak	Spacewatch	·	940 m	MPC · JPL
457555	2008 YP_{80}	—	December 22, 2008	Kitt Peak	Spacewatch	·	3.0 km	MPC · JPL
457556	2008 YC_{89}	—	December 29, 2008	Kitt Peak	Spacewatch	·	710 m	MPC · JPL
457557	2008 YG_{90}	—	December 4, 2008	Mount Lemmon	Mount Lemmon Survey	·	580 m	MPC · JPL
457558	2008 YV_{90}	—	December 4, 2008	Mount Lemmon	Mount Lemmon Survey	·	770 m	MPC · JPL
457559	2008 YX_{96}	—	December 21, 2008	Mount Lemmon	Mount Lemmon Survey	·	1.1 km	MPC · JPL
457560	2008 YQ_{100}	—	November 1, 2008	Kitt Peak	Spacewatch	V	740 m	MPC · JPL
457561	2008 YV_{100}	—	December 29, 2008	Kitt Peak	Spacewatch	NYS	960 m	MPC · JPL
457562	2008 YL_{103}	—	December 29, 2008	Kitt Peak	Spacewatch	·	640 m	MPC · JPL
457563	2008 YM_{105}	—	December 29, 2008	Kitt Peak	Spacewatch	·	830 m	MPC · JPL
457564	2008 YU_{107}	—	December 29, 2008	Kitt Peak	Spacewatch	·	740 m	MPC · JPL
457565	2008 YV_{112}	—	December 22, 2008	Kitt Peak	Spacewatch	·	430 m	MPC · JPL
457566	2008 YB_{120}	—	December 30, 2008	Kitt Peak	Spacewatch	(2076)	630 m	MPC · JPL
457567	2008 YX_{122}	—	December 30, 2008	Kitt Peak	Spacewatch	·	760 m	MPC · JPL
457568	2008 YX_{123}	—	November 20, 2008	Mount Lemmon	Mount Lemmon Survey	·	1.0 km	MPC · JPL
457569	2008 YZ_{124}	—	November 24, 2008	Mount Lemmon	Mount Lemmon Survey	·	600 m	MPC · JPL
457570	2008 YB_{127}	—	December 30, 2008	Kitt Peak	Spacewatch	·	850 m	MPC · JPL
457571	2008 YL_{134}	—	November 7, 2008	Mount Lemmon	Mount Lemmon Survey	·	750 m	MPC · JPL
457572	2008 YZ_{138}	—	December 30, 2008	Mount Lemmon	Mount Lemmon Survey	CYB	3.5 km	MPC · JPL
457573	2008 YN_{139}	—	December 4, 2008	Mount Lemmon	Mount Lemmon Survey	·	740 m	MPC · JPL
457574	2008 YV_{140}	—	December 30, 2008	Mount Lemmon	Mount Lemmon Survey	·	800 m	MPC · JPL
457575	2008 YG_{143}	—	November 21, 2008	Mount Lemmon	Mount Lemmon Survey	V	610 m	MPC · JPL
457576	2008 YV_{145}	—	December 22, 2008	Mount Lemmon	Mount Lemmon Survey	·	1.2 km	MPC · JPL
457577	2008 YT_{150}	—	December 22, 2008	Kitt Peak	Spacewatch	V	700 m	MPC · JPL
457578	2008 YB_{155}	—	December 22, 2008	Mount Lemmon	Mount Lemmon Survey	PHO	1.9 km	MPC · JPL
457579	2008 YQ_{155}	—	December 22, 2008	Kitt Peak	Spacewatch	V	450 m	MPC · JPL
457580	2008 YV_{162}	—	December 22, 2008	Mount Lemmon	Mount Lemmon Survey	·	590 m	MPC · JPL
457581	2008 YO_{165}	—	December 29, 2008	Mount Lemmon	Mount Lemmon Survey	NYS	760 m	MPC · JPL
457582	2008 YA_{173}	—	December 30, 2008	Mount Lemmon	Mount Lemmon Survey	·	850 m	MPC · JPL
457583	2009 AW_{10}	—	December 22, 2008	Kitt Peak	Spacewatch	·	550 m	MPC · JPL
457584	2009 AY_{14}	—	January 2, 2009	Mount Lemmon	Mount Lemmon Survey	·	760 m	MPC · JPL
457585	2009 AF_{20}	—	December 21, 2008	Kitt Peak	Spacewatch	NYS	810 m	MPC · JPL
457586	2009 AY_{20}	—	December 21, 2008	Kitt Peak	Spacewatch	·	600 m	MPC · JPL
457587	2009 AV_{27}	—	November 24, 2008	Mount Lemmon	Mount Lemmon Survey	·	700 m	MPC · JPL
457588	2009 AM_{28}	—	January 8, 2009	Kitt Peak	Spacewatch	·	780 m	MPC · JPL
457589	2009 AF_{31}	—	November 24, 2008	Mount Lemmon	Mount Lemmon Survey	·	730 m	MPC · JPL
457590	2009 AN_{33}	—	January 15, 2009	Kitt Peak	Spacewatch	·	820 m	MPC · JPL
457591	2009 AX_{40}	—	January 15, 2009	Kitt Peak	Spacewatch	·	640 m	MPC · JPL
457592	2009 AD_{44}	—	January 3, 2009	Kitt Peak	Spacewatch	·	670 m	MPC · JPL
457593	2009 AH_{45}	—	January 15, 2009	Kitt Peak	Spacewatch	·	760 m	MPC · JPL
457594	2009 AU_{47}	—	January 1, 2009	Kitt Peak	Spacewatch	PHO	990 m	MPC · JPL
457595	2009 BO_{10}	—	January 22, 2009	Mayhill	Lowe, A.	·	590 m	MPC · JPL
457596	2009 BU_{16}	—	December 30, 2008	Mount Lemmon	Mount Lemmon Survey	·	840 m	MPC · JPL
457597	2009 BA_{23}	—	December 30, 2008	Mount Lemmon	Mount Lemmon Survey	·	700 m	MPC · JPL
457598	2009 BP_{31}	—	January 16, 2009	Kitt Peak	Spacewatch	·	580 m	MPC · JPL
457599	2009 BU_{31}	—	January 16, 2009	Kitt Peak	Spacewatch	·	850 m	MPC · JPL
457600	2009 BS_{35}	—	January 16, 2009	Kitt Peak	Spacewatch	·	780 m	MPC · JPL

== 457601–457700 ==
back to top

Designation			Discovery			Properties		Ref
Permanent	Provisional	Named after	Date	Site	Discoverer(s)	Category	Diam.	Ref
457601	2009 BZ_{36}	—	January 1, 2009	Mount Lemmon	Mount Lemmon Survey	·	660 m	MPC · JPL
457602	2009 BA_{40}	—	January 16, 2009	Kitt Peak	Spacewatch	·	560 m	MPC · JPL
457603	2009 BH_{40}	—	October 10, 2004	Kitt Peak	Spacewatch	·	1.0 km	MPC · JPL
457604	2009 BB_{41}	—	January 16, 2009	Kitt Peak	Spacewatch	·	720 m	MPC · JPL
457605	2009 BB_{42}	—	January 16, 2009	Kitt Peak	Spacewatch	·	1.2 km	MPC · JPL
457606	2009 BG_{43}	—	January 16, 2009	Kitt Peak	Spacewatch	·	680 m	MPC · JPL
457607	2009 BX_{54}	—	January 16, 2009	Mount Lemmon	Mount Lemmon Survey	·	680 m	MPC · JPL
457608	2009 BY_{54}	—	January 16, 2009	Mount Lemmon	Mount Lemmon Survey	·	650 m	MPC · JPL
457609	2009 BC_{66}	—	January 20, 2009	Kitt Peak	Spacewatch	·	1.1 km	MPC · JPL
457610	2009 BX_{67}	—	January 20, 2009	Kitt Peak	Spacewatch	H	520 m	MPC · JPL
457611	2009 BF_{68}	—	December 7, 2004	Socorro	LINEAR	·	1.0 km	MPC · JPL
457612	2009 BQ_{68}	—	December 22, 2008	Mount Lemmon	Mount Lemmon Survey	PHO	2.8 km	MPC · JPL
457613	2009 BF_{69}	—	December 3, 2008	Mount Lemmon	Mount Lemmon Survey	·	800 m	MPC · JPL
457614	2009 BA_{81}	—	September 15, 2007	Kitt Peak	Spacewatch	·	930 m	MPC · JPL
457615	2009 BD_{85}	—	January 25, 2009	Kitt Peak	Spacewatch	·	800 m	MPC · JPL
457616	2009 BH_{86}	—	January 25, 2009	Kitt Peak	Spacewatch	·	1.0 km	MPC · JPL
457617	2009 BK_{86}	—	January 25, 2009	Kitt Peak	Spacewatch	·	680 m	MPC · JPL
457618	2009 BJ_{89}	—	December 30, 2008	Mount Lemmon	Mount Lemmon Survey	·	610 m	MPC · JPL
457619	2009 BW_{89}	—	December 3, 2008	Mount Lemmon	Mount Lemmon Survey	·	2.4 km	MPC · JPL
457620	2009 BJ_{93}	—	January 25, 2009	Kitt Peak	Spacewatch	V	500 m	MPC · JPL
457621	2009 BZ_{93}	—	January 25, 2009	Kitt Peak	Spacewatch	·	820 m	MPC · JPL
457622	2009 BK_{94}	—	December 22, 2008	Mount Lemmon	Mount Lemmon Survey	MAS	630 m	MPC · JPL
457623	2009 BA_{96}	—	January 28, 2009	Catalina	CSS	·	640 m	MPC · JPL
457624	2009 BX_{100}	—	January 29, 2009	Kitt Peak	Spacewatch	(2076)	900 m	MPC · JPL
457625	2009 BK_{104}	—	January 25, 2009	Kitt Peak	Spacewatch	·	800 m	MPC · JPL
457626	2009 BZ_{109}	—	January 30, 2009	Mount Lemmon	Mount Lemmon Survey	·	810 m	MPC · JPL
457627	2009 BS_{118}	—	December 30, 2008	Kitt Peak	Spacewatch	·	630 m	MPC · JPL
457628	2009 BB_{123}	—	January 31, 2009	Kitt Peak	Spacewatch	·	700 m	MPC · JPL
457629	2009 BY_{126}	—	January 29, 2009	Kitt Peak	Spacewatch	·	740 m	MPC · JPL
457630	2009 BV_{129}	—	January 30, 2009	Mount Lemmon	Mount Lemmon Survey	·	760 m	MPC · JPL
457631	2009 BY_{129}	—	January 16, 2009	Kitt Peak	Spacewatch	·	690 m	MPC · JPL
457632	2009 BY_{135}	—	January 29, 2009	Kitt Peak	Spacewatch	·	530 m	MPC · JPL
457633	2009 BF_{143}	—	January 30, 2009	Kitt Peak	Spacewatch	·	550 m	MPC · JPL
457634	2009 BO_{145}	—	January 15, 2009	Kitt Peak	Spacewatch	V	580 m	MPC · JPL
457635	2009 BD_{148}	—	January 30, 2009	Mount Lemmon	Mount Lemmon Survey	·	850 m	MPC · JPL
457636	2009 BN_{155}	—	January 16, 2009	Mount Lemmon	Mount Lemmon Survey	·	970 m	MPC · JPL
457637	2009 BM_{156}	—	January 31, 2009	Kitt Peak	Spacewatch	·	820 m	MPC · JPL
457638	2009 BH_{157}	—	January 25, 2009	Kitt Peak	Spacewatch	NYS	860 m	MPC · JPL
457639	2009 BQ_{157}	—	January 31, 2009	Kitt Peak	Spacewatch	·	970 m	MPC · JPL
457640	2009 BK_{174}	—	January 25, 2009	Kitt Peak	Spacewatch	·	980 m	MPC · JPL
457641	2009 BX_{174}	—	December 9, 2004	Kitt Peak	Spacewatch	NYS	750 m	MPC · JPL
457642	2009 BZ_{181}	—	January 31, 2009	Mount Lemmon	Mount Lemmon Survey	MAS	630 m	MPC · JPL
457643	2009 BW_{184}	—	January 18, 2009	Kitt Peak	Spacewatch	·	1.1 km	MPC · JPL
457644	2009 BG_{185}	—	January 25, 2009	Socorro	LINEAR	·	690 m	MPC · JPL
457645	2009 BW_{189}	—	January 31, 2009	Kitt Peak	Spacewatch	·	620 m	MPC · JPL
457646	2009 BD_{190}	—	January 3, 2009	Mount Lemmon	Mount Lemmon Survey	NYS	830 m	MPC · JPL
457647	2009 CZ	—	February 3, 2009	Catalina	CSS	APO +1km	2.0 km	MPC · JPL
457648	2009 CE_{5}	—	February 13, 2009	Calar Alto	F. Hormuth	·	760 m	MPC · JPL
457649	2009 CK_{8}	—	December 22, 2008	Mount Lemmon	Mount Lemmon Survey	·	660 m	MPC · JPL
457650	2009 CV_{21}	—	February 1, 2009	Kitt Peak	Spacewatch	·	720 m	MPC · JPL
457651	2009 CW_{23}	—	January 25, 2009	Kitt Peak	Spacewatch	·	1.1 km	MPC · JPL
457652	2009 CN_{28}	—	January 17, 2009	Kitt Peak	Spacewatch	NYS	700 m	MPC · JPL
457653	2009 CL_{29}	—	December 31, 2008	Mount Lemmon	Mount Lemmon Survey	·	910 m	MPC · JPL
457654	2009 CT_{34}	—	February 2, 2009	Mount Lemmon	Mount Lemmon Survey	·	600 m	MPC · JPL
457655	2009 CJ_{38}	—	February 13, 2009	Kitt Peak	Spacewatch	·	640 m	MPC · JPL
457656	2009 CJ_{41}	—	January 15, 2009	Kitt Peak	Spacewatch	NYS	1.0 km	MPC · JPL
457657	2009 CJ_{42}	—	January 25, 2009	Kitt Peak	Spacewatch	·	710 m	MPC · JPL
457658	2009 CZ_{46}	—	February 14, 2009	Kitt Peak	Spacewatch	·	720 m	MPC · JPL
457659	2009 CX_{47}	—	January 25, 2009	Catalina	CSS	PHO	830 m	MPC · JPL
457660	2009 CR_{48}	—	February 14, 2009	Mount Lemmon	Mount Lemmon Survey	·	550 m	MPC · JPL
457661	2009 CB_{56}	—	February 1, 2009	Kitt Peak	Spacewatch	NYS	630 m	MPC · JPL
457662	2009 DZ	—	February 18, 2009	Socorro	LINEAR	AMO · APO · PHA	140 m	MPC · JPL
457663	2009 DN_{1}	—	February 19, 2009	Socorro	LINEAR	AMO	310 m	MPC · JPL
457664	2009 DY_{8}	—	January 3, 2009	Mount Lemmon	Mount Lemmon Survey	·	1.0 km	MPC · JPL
457665	2009 DO_{15}	—	February 16, 2009	La Sagra	OAM	·	780 m	MPC · JPL
457666	2009 DQ_{19}	—	January 29, 2009	Catalina	CSS	·	790 m	MPC · JPL
457667	2009 DJ_{34}	—	February 1, 2009	Mount Lemmon	Mount Lemmon Survey	·	1.1 km	MPC · JPL
457668	2009 DW_{35}	—	February 20, 2009	Kitt Peak	Spacewatch	·	640 m	MPC · JPL
457669	2009 DL_{43}	—	February 25, 2009	Dauban	Kugel, F.	V	600 m	MPC · JPL
457670	2009 DX_{46}	—	January 17, 2009	Kitt Peak	Spacewatch	·	1.1 km	MPC · JPL
457671	2009 DN_{49}	—	February 19, 2009	Kitt Peak	Spacewatch	NYS	1.1 km	MPC · JPL
457672	2009 DP_{49}	—	February 19, 2009	Kitt Peak	Spacewatch	·	1.1 km	MPC · JPL
457673	2009 DW_{50}	—	February 19, 2009	Kitt Peak	Spacewatch	MAS	680 m	MPC · JPL
457674	2009 DP_{54}	—	February 22, 2009	Kitt Peak	Spacewatch	·	860 m	MPC · JPL
457675	2009 DG_{71}	—	January 17, 2009	Kitt Peak	Spacewatch	MAS	710 m	MPC · JPL
457676	2009 DG_{72}	—	January 18, 2009	Mount Lemmon	Mount Lemmon Survey	·	910 m	MPC · JPL
457677	2009 DA_{73}	—	February 24, 2009	Catalina	CSS	PHO	960 m	MPC · JPL
457678	2009 DT_{78}	—	January 17, 2009	Kitt Peak	Spacewatch	·	650 m	MPC · JPL
457679	2009 DM_{81}	—	February 24, 2009	Kitt Peak	Spacewatch	NYS	760 m	MPC · JPL
457680	2009 DZ_{82}	—	February 24, 2009	Kitt Peak	Spacewatch	MAS	700 m	MPC · JPL
457681	2009 DS_{85}	—	November 21, 2003	Kitt Peak	Spacewatch	·	1.3 km	MPC · JPL
457682	2009 DS_{86}	—	February 27, 2009	Kitt Peak	Spacewatch	·	1.1 km	MPC · JPL
457683	2009 DQ_{91}	—	February 27, 2009	Kitt Peak	Spacewatch	·	900 m	MPC · JPL
457684	2009 DR_{100}	—	February 26, 2009	Kitt Peak	Spacewatch	·	780 m	MPC · JPL
457685	2009 DB_{103}	—	February 26, 2009	Kitt Peak	Spacewatch	·	1.3 km	MPC · JPL
457686	2009 DF_{112}	—	January 3, 2009	Mount Lemmon	Mount Lemmon Survey	V	630 m	MPC · JPL
457687	2009 DL_{112}	—	January 25, 2009	Kitt Peak	Spacewatch	NYS	670 m	MPC · JPL
457688	2009 DM_{130}	—	February 26, 2009	Kitt Peak	Spacewatch	MAS	670 m	MPC · JPL
457689	2009 DT_{130}	—	February 27, 2009	Mount Lemmon	Mount Lemmon Survey	PHO	910 m	MPC · JPL
457690	2009 DA_{137}	—	February 28, 2009	Kitt Peak	Spacewatch	·	830 m	MPC · JPL
457691	2009 DE_{140}	—	October 26, 2008	Mount Lemmon	Mount Lemmon Survey	·	1.0 km	MPC · JPL
457692	2009 EB_{4}	—	December 30, 2008	Mount Lemmon	Mount Lemmon Survey	·	1.2 km	MPC · JPL
457693	2009 EL_{4}	—	March 15, 2009	La Sagra	OAM	·	1.0 km	MPC · JPL
457694	2009 EL_{13}	—	February 20, 2009	Mount Lemmon	Mount Lemmon Survey	NYS	1.1 km	MPC · JPL
457695	2009 ET_{13}	—	March 15, 2009	Kitt Peak	Spacewatch	NYS	810 m	MPC · JPL
457696	2009 EO_{14}	—	February 1, 2009	Catalina	CSS	·	830 m	MPC · JPL
457697	2009 EZ_{16}	—	March 15, 2009	Kitt Peak	Spacewatch	·	690 m	MPC · JPL
457698	2009 ED_{17}	—	February 2, 2009	Kitt Peak	Spacewatch	·	900 m	MPC · JPL
457699	2009 EB_{23}	—	March 3, 2009	Kitt Peak	Spacewatch	·	670 m	MPC · JPL
457700	2009 EE_{25}	—	March 3, 2009	Mount Lemmon	Mount Lemmon Survey	MAS	570 m	MPC · JPL

== 457701–457800 ==
back to top

Designation			Discovery			Properties		Ref
Permanent	Provisional	Named after	Date	Site	Discoverer(s)	Category	Diam.	Ref
457701	2009 EN_{25}	—	March 3, 2009	Mount Lemmon	Mount Lemmon Survey	·	760 m	MPC · JPL
457702	2009 EM_{29}	—	March 2, 2009	Mount Lemmon	Mount Lemmon Survey	NYS	1.2 km	MPC · JPL
457703	2009 FP_{1}	—	March 16, 2009	La Sagra	OAM	·	1.3 km	MPC · JPL
457704	2009 FO_{5}	—	February 1, 2009	Kitt Peak	Spacewatch	V	590 m	MPC · JPL
457705	2009 FN_{6}	—	February 26, 2009	Catalina	CSS	H	460 m	MPC · JPL
457706	2009 FP_{13}	—	March 3, 2009	Kitt Peak	Spacewatch	·	1.2 km	MPC · JPL
457707	2009 FJ_{14}	—	March 19, 2009	Pla D'Arguines	R. Ferrando	PHO	730 m	MPC · JPL
457708	2009 FO_{14}	—	March 20, 2009	Heppenheim	Starkenburg	MAS	690 m	MPC · JPL
457709	2009 FN_{22}	—	March 19, 2009	Kitt Peak	Spacewatch	·	1.0 km	MPC · JPL
457710	2009 FC_{29}	—	March 22, 2009	Catalina	CSS	·	920 m	MPC · JPL
457711	2009 FU_{32}	—	January 2, 2009	Catalina	CSS	PHO	1.1 km	MPC · JPL
457712	2009 FX_{36}	—	March 21, 2009	Kitt Peak	Spacewatch	PHO	830 m	MPC · JPL
457713	2009 FT_{39}	—	March 27, 2009	Catalina	CSS	·	860 m	MPC · JPL
457714	2009 FM_{45}	—	February 19, 2009	Kitt Peak	Spacewatch	MAS	660 m	MPC · JPL
457715	2009 FD_{49}	—	March 26, 2009	Catalina	CSS	·	1.8 km	MPC · JPL
457716	2009 FY_{49}	—	March 27, 2009	Catalina	CSS	·	910 m	MPC · JPL
457717	2009 FE_{50}	—	February 14, 2009	Mount Lemmon	Mount Lemmon Survey	·	730 m	MPC · JPL
457718	2009 FA_{55}	—	February 24, 2009	Kitt Peak	Spacewatch	NYS	1.1 km	MPC · JPL
457719	2009 FT_{55}	—	March 16, 2009	Catalina	CSS	PHO	2.7 km	MPC · JPL
457720	2009 FP_{60}	—	March 7, 2009	Mount Lemmon	Mount Lemmon Survey	·	1.1 km	MPC · JPL
457721	2009 FT_{60}	—	March 21, 2009	La Sagra	OAM	·	870 m	MPC · JPL
457722	2009 FD_{63}	—	March 28, 2009	Kitt Peak	Spacewatch	·	1.2 km	MPC · JPL
457723	2009 FM_{63}	—	March 28, 2009	Kitt Peak	Spacewatch	·	960 m	MPC · JPL
457724	2009 FP_{65}	—	March 18, 2009	Kitt Peak	Spacewatch	V	620 m	MPC · JPL
457725	2009 FE_{66}	—	March 19, 2009	Kitt Peak	Spacewatch	·	1.1 km	MPC · JPL
457726	2009 FA_{68}	—	March 31, 2009	Kitt Peak	Spacewatch	MAS	640 m	MPC · JPL
457727	2009 FG_{68}	—	March 29, 2009	Kitt Peak	Spacewatch	NYS	1.1 km	MPC · JPL
457728	2009 FS_{69}	—	March 18, 2009	Kitt Peak	Spacewatch	·	1.0 km	MPC · JPL
457729	2009 FD_{70}	—	March 19, 2009	Catalina	CSS	·	3.6 km	MPC · JPL
457730	2009 FH_{70}	—	March 19, 2009	Kitt Peak	Spacewatch	·	1.1 km	MPC · JPL
457731	2009 FB_{74}	—	March 31, 2009	Kitt Peak	Spacewatch	NYS	1.0 km	MPC · JPL
457732	2009 GT_{3}	—	April 15, 2009	Črni Vrh	Mikuž, H.	·	1.3 km	MPC · JPL
457733	2009 HS	—	April 16, 2009	Catalina	CSS	·	1.3 km	MPC · JPL
457734	2009 HJ_{3}	—	April 16, 2009	Catalina	CSS	PHO	1 km	MPC · JPL
457735	2009 HA_{12}	—	March 22, 2009	Catalina	CSS	PHO	1.1 km	MPC · JPL
457736	2009 HY_{12}	—	April 17, 2009	Kitt Peak	Spacewatch	3:2	5.1 km	MPC · JPL
457737	2009 HW_{13}	—	April 17, 2009	Mount Lemmon	Mount Lemmon Survey	PHO	1.1 km	MPC · JPL
457738	2009 HE_{14}	—	March 29, 2009	Kitt Peak	Spacewatch	·	900 m	MPC · JPL
457739	2009 HJ_{14}	—	April 17, 2009	Catalina	CSS	NYS	1.1 km	MPC · JPL
457740	2009 HR_{15}	—	April 18, 2009	Kitt Peak	Spacewatch	NYS	1.1 km	MPC · JPL
457741	2009 HK_{16}	—	March 29, 2009	Mount Lemmon	Mount Lemmon Survey	·	1.4 km	MPC · JPL
457742	2009 HG_{19}	—	October 16, 2007	Kitt Peak	Spacewatch	·	980 m	MPC · JPL
457743 Balklavs	2009 HW_{20}	Balklavs	April 18, 2009	Baldone	K. Černis, I. Eglītis	NYS	970 m	MPC · JPL
457744	2009 HG_{24}	—	April 17, 2009	Kitt Peak	Spacewatch	·	1.2 km	MPC · JPL
457745	2009 HU_{40}	—	April 20, 2009	Kitt Peak	Spacewatch	·	980 m	MPC · JPL
457746	2009 HT_{43}	—	April 20, 2009	Kitt Peak	Spacewatch	NYS	1.2 km	MPC · JPL
457747	2009 HB_{49}	—	February 4, 2009	Kitt Peak	Spacewatch	·	1.3 km	MPC · JPL
457748	2009 HK_{54}	—	April 20, 2009	Kitt Peak	Spacewatch	·	1.1 km	MPC · JPL
457749	2009 HZ_{58}	—	April 18, 2009	Kitt Peak	Spacewatch	NYS	1.3 km	MPC · JPL
457750	2009 HE_{62}	—	March 30, 2009	Mount Lemmon	Mount Lemmon Survey	·	940 m	MPC · JPL
457751	2009 HB_{68}	—	April 22, 2009	Kitt Peak	Spacewatch	·	1.0 km	MPC · JPL
457752	2009 HK_{68}	—	April 27, 2009	Tzec Maun	E. Schwab	V	590 m	MPC · JPL
457753	2009 HU_{69}	—	April 22, 2009	Mount Lemmon	Mount Lemmon Survey	·	750 m	MPC · JPL
457754	2009 HD_{77}	—	April 28, 2009	Catalina	CSS	·	1.2 km	MPC · JPL
457755	2009 HL_{80}	—	April 28, 2009	Catalina	CSS	·	1.2 km	MPC · JPL
457756	2009 HL_{83}	—	March 24, 2009	Mount Lemmon	Mount Lemmon Survey	·	1.6 km	MPC · JPL
457757	2009 HP_{88}	—	April 30, 2009	La Sagra	OAM	·	1.1 km	MPC · JPL
457758	2009 HV_{95}	—	April 20, 2009	Mount Lemmon	Mount Lemmon Survey	·	1.1 km	MPC · JPL
457759	2009 HY_{99}	—	April 23, 2009	Kitt Peak	Spacewatch	·	1.1 km	MPC · JPL
457760	2009 HN_{105}	—	April 23, 2009	Kitt Peak	Spacewatch	·	800 m	MPC · JPL
457761	2009 JT_{3}	—	March 31, 2009	Mount Lemmon	Mount Lemmon Survey	·	1.2 km	MPC · JPL
457762	2009 JX_{8}	—	May 13, 2009	Kitt Peak	Spacewatch	L5	8.4 km	MPC · JPL
457763	2009 JD_{9}	—	April 20, 2009	Catalina	CSS	PHO	840 m	MPC · JPL
457764	2009 JS_{11}	—	May 15, 2009	Kitt Peak	Spacewatch	EUN	920 m	MPC · JPL
457765	2009 JD_{18}	—	May 1, 2009	Kitt Peak	Spacewatch	·	1.3 km	MPC · JPL
457766	2009 KT_{2}	—	May 20, 2009	La Sagra	OAM	PHO	970 m	MPC · JPL
457767	2009 KF_{4}	—	May 24, 2009	Catalina	CSS	·	1.5 km	MPC · JPL
457768	2009 KN_{4}	—	May 23, 2009	Siding Spring	SSS	APO · PHA	750 m	MPC · JPL
457769	2009 KZ_{4}	—	May 22, 2009	Bergisch Gladbach	W. Bickel	NYS	850 m	MPC · JPL
457770	2009 KA_{6}	—	May 25, 2009	Mount Lemmon	Mount Lemmon Survey	L5	9.2 km	MPC · JPL
457771	2009 KD_{11}	—	April 24, 2009	Kitt Peak	Spacewatch	EUN	1.1 km	MPC · JPL
457772	2009 KQ_{37}	—	April 19, 2009	Kitt Peak	Spacewatch	·	2.7 km	MPC · JPL
457773	2009 LK_{4}	—	May 13, 2009	Mount Lemmon	Mount Lemmon Survey	·	2.5 km	MPC · JPL
457774	2009 MP_{1}	—	June 16, 2009	Kitt Peak	Spacewatch	PHO	3.3 km	MPC · JPL
457775	2009 MG_{8}	—	June 28, 2009	La Sagra	OAM	JUN	1.1 km	MPC · JPL
457776	2009 NE_{2}	—	July 14, 2009	Kitt Peak	Spacewatch	·	1.8 km	MPC · JPL
457777	2009 OA_{1}	—	July 19, 2009	La Sagra	OAM	H	590 m	MPC · JPL
457778	2009 OQ_{3}	—	July 22, 2009	La Sagra	OAM	·	2.3 km	MPC · JPL
457779	2009 OE_{21}	—	July 29, 2009	La Sagra	OAM	·	2.1 km	MPC · JPL
457780	2009 OD_{25}	—	July 29, 2009	Catalina	CSS	H	570 m	MPC · JPL
457781	2009 PP_{9}	—	August 15, 2009	Kitt Peak	Spacewatch	·	2.0 km	MPC · JPL
457782	2009 PR_{9}	—	July 29, 2009	Kitt Peak	Spacewatch	·	3.0 km	MPC · JPL
457783	2009 PS_{9}	—	July 28, 2009	Catalina	CSS	·	1.1 km	MPC · JPL
457784	2009 PL_{10}	—	August 15, 2009	La Sagra	OAM	JUN	1.0 km	MPC · JPL
457785	2009 PJ_{15}	—	August 15, 2009	Catalina	CSS	·	1.5 km	MPC · JPL
457786	2009 PQ_{16}	—	August 15, 2009	Kitt Peak	Spacewatch	·	2.3 km	MPC · JPL
457787	2009 QB	—	September 8, 2004	Socorro	LINEAR	H	560 m	MPC · JPL
457788	2009 QU_{2}	—	August 16, 2009	Kitt Peak	Spacewatch	·	1.9 km	MPC · JPL
457789	2009 QC_{4}	—	August 17, 2009	Catalina	CSS	·	2.1 km	MPC · JPL
457790	2009 QE_{20}	—	August 19, 2009	La Sagra	OAM	H	520 m	MPC · JPL
457791	2009 QM_{23}	—	August 16, 2009	La Sagra	OAM	ADE	2.0 km	MPC · JPL
457792	2009 QC_{24}	—	August 16, 2009	Kitt Peak	Spacewatch	HOF	2.5 km	MPC · JPL
457793	2009 QR_{28}	—	August 19, 2009	Kitt Peak	Spacewatch	H	420 m	MPC · JPL
457794	2009 QS_{30}	—	August 21, 2009	Socorro	LINEAR	·	2.6 km	MPC · JPL
457795	2009 QX_{30}	—	August 24, 2009	La Sagra	OAM	H	630 m	MPC · JPL
457796	2009 QB_{33}	—	August 18, 2009	La Sagra	OAM	H	510 m	MPC · JPL
457797	2009 QR_{36}	—	May 27, 2009	Catalina	CSS	·	2.0 km	MPC · JPL
457798	2009 QH_{38}	—	August 29, 2009	Bergisch Gladbach	W. Bickel	H	570 m	MPC · JPL
457799	2009 QP_{60}	—	August 18, 2009	Kitt Peak	Spacewatch	·	1.7 km	MPC · JPL
457800	2009 QT_{60}	—	August 19, 2009	Catalina	CSS	·	3.6 km	MPC · JPL

== 457801–457900 ==
back to top

Designation			Discovery			Properties		Ref
Permanent	Provisional	Named after	Date	Site	Discoverer(s)	Category	Diam.	Ref
457801	2009 RC_{3}	—	August 17, 2009	Catalina	CSS	·	2.2 km	MPC · JPL
457802	2009 RY_{6}	—	August 16, 2009	Kitt Peak	Spacewatch	H	550 m	MPC · JPL
457803	2009 RS_{7}	—	September 11, 2009	Catalina	CSS	·	2.5 km	MPC · JPL
457804	2009 RV_{8}	—	September 12, 2009	Kitt Peak	Spacewatch	·	960 m	MPC · JPL
457805	2009 RA_{11}	—	September 12, 2009	Kitt Peak	Spacewatch	PAD	1.4 km	MPC · JPL
457806	2009 RT_{11}	—	September 12, 2009	Kitt Peak	Spacewatch	·	2.2 km	MPC · JPL
457807	2009 RK_{14}	—	September 12, 2009	Kitt Peak	Spacewatch	·	1.7 km	MPC · JPL
457808	2009 RY_{21}	—	July 30, 2009	Kitt Peak	Spacewatch	H	510 m	MPC · JPL
457809	2009 RF_{26}	—	September 13, 2009	Socorro	LINEAR	·	2.7 km	MPC · JPL
457810	2009 RF_{27}	—	September 15, 2009	Mount Lemmon	Mount Lemmon Survey	·	1.7 km	MPC · JPL
457811	2009 RM_{30}	—	September 14, 2009	Kitt Peak	Spacewatch	·	1.6 km	MPC · JPL
457812	2009 RL_{49}	—	September 15, 2009	Kitt Peak	Spacewatch	·	2.6 km	MPC · JPL
457813	2009 RD_{50}	—	September 15, 2009	Kitt Peak	Spacewatch	·	1.7 km	MPC · JPL
457814	2009 RK_{53}	—	September 15, 2009	Kitt Peak	Spacewatch	·	770 m	MPC · JPL
457815	2009 RZ_{53}	—	September 15, 2009	Kitt Peak	Spacewatch	THM	2.0 km	MPC · JPL
457816	2009 RS_{54}	—	September 15, 2009	Kitt Peak	Spacewatch	LIX	3.5 km	MPC · JPL
457817	2009 RB_{55}	—	September 15, 2009	Kitt Peak	Spacewatch	GEF	1.3 km	MPC · JPL
457818 Ramírezmoreta	2009 RB_{58}	Ramírezmoreta	September 10, 2009	ESA OGS	ESA OGS	·	2.2 km	MPC · JPL
457819	2009 SY_{11}	—	September 16, 2009	Mount Lemmon	Mount Lemmon Survey	·	1.7 km	MPC · JPL
457820	2009 SU_{46}	—	April 18, 2007	Mount Lemmon	Mount Lemmon Survey	·	2.4 km	MPC · JPL
457821	2009 SW_{47}	—	September 16, 2009	Kitt Peak	Spacewatch	·	3.2 km	MPC · JPL
457822	2009 SB_{48}	—	September 16, 2009	Kitt Peak	Spacewatch	·	2.3 km	MPC · JPL
457823	2009 SP_{52}	—	September 17, 2009	Kitt Peak	Spacewatch	·	1.3 km	MPC · JPL
457824	2009 SW_{55}	—	September 17, 2009	Kitt Peak	Spacewatch	·	2.4 km	MPC · JPL
457825	2009 SV_{59}	—	September 17, 2009	Kitt Peak	Spacewatch	·	1.7 km	MPC · JPL
457826	2009 SW_{59}	—	September 17, 2009	Kitt Peak	Spacewatch	·	1.5 km	MPC · JPL
457827	2009 SF_{60}	—	September 17, 2009	Kitt Peak	Spacewatch	·	2.0 km	MPC · JPL
457828	2009 SX_{61}	—	September 17, 2009	Mount Lemmon	Mount Lemmon Survey	·	1.6 km	MPC · JPL
457829	2009 ST_{65}	—	August 20, 2009	Kitt Peak	Spacewatch	·	1.6 km	MPC · JPL
457830	2009 SB_{72}	—	August 27, 2009	Kitt Peak	Spacewatch	·	1.8 km	MPC · JPL
457831	2009 SX_{75}	—	September 17, 2009	Kitt Peak	Spacewatch	·	1.9 km	MPC · JPL
457832	2009 SM_{76}	—	September 17, 2009	Kitt Peak	Spacewatch	·	2.6 km	MPC · JPL
457833	2009 SN_{79}	—	September 18, 2009	Kitt Peak	Spacewatch	·	1.3 km	MPC · JPL
457834	2009 SQ_{86}	—	September 18, 2009	Kitt Peak	Spacewatch	·	1.3 km	MPC · JPL
457835	2009 ST_{90}	—	September 18, 2009	Mount Lemmon	Mount Lemmon Survey	·	1.6 km	MPC · JPL
457836	2009 SF_{92}	—	September 18, 2009	Mount Lemmon	Mount Lemmon Survey	·	1.9 km	MPC · JPL
457837	2009 SS_{92}	—	September 18, 2009	Mount Lemmon	Mount Lemmon Survey	·	2.6 km	MPC · JPL
457838	2009 SW_{97}	—	September 20, 2009	Mount Lemmon	Mount Lemmon Survey	·	3.2 km	MPC · JPL
457839	2009 SX_{100}	—	September 21, 2009	Mount Lemmon	Mount Lemmon Survey	·	1.4 km	MPC · JPL
457840	2009 SW_{107}	—	September 16, 2009	Mount Lemmon	Mount Lemmon Survey	·	2.0 km	MPC · JPL
457841	2009 SZ_{113}	—	September 18, 2009	Kitt Peak	Spacewatch	MRX	1.0 km	MPC · JPL
457842	2009 SD_{123}	—	October 24, 2005	Kitt Peak	Spacewatch	ADE	2.2 km	MPC · JPL
457843	2009 SK_{123}	—	September 18, 2009	Kitt Peak	Spacewatch	·	1.8 km	MPC · JPL
457844	2009 SX_{123}	—	September 11, 2004	Kitt Peak	Spacewatch	·	2.2 km	MPC · JPL
457845	2009 SH_{128}	—	September 18, 2009	Kitt Peak	Spacewatch	·	2.3 km	MPC · JPL
457846	2009 SK_{136}	—	September 18, 2009	Kitt Peak	Spacewatch	·	2.5 km	MPC · JPL
457847	2009 SA_{142}	—	September 15, 2009	Kitt Peak	Spacewatch	·	1.7 km	MPC · JPL
457848	2009 SS_{147}	—	September 19, 2009	Mount Lemmon	Mount Lemmon Survey	·	1.8 km	MPC · JPL
457849	2009 SX_{149}	—	September 20, 2009	Kitt Peak	Spacewatch	·	2.2 km	MPC · JPL
457850	2009 SR_{153}	—	September 20, 2009	Kitt Peak	Spacewatch	KOR	1.1 km	MPC · JPL
457851	2009 SY_{154}	—	March 10, 2008	Kitt Peak	Spacewatch	·	1.4 km	MPC · JPL
457852	2009 SJ_{164}	—	August 28, 2009	Kitt Peak	Spacewatch	·	1.5 km	MPC · JPL
457853	2009 SE_{168}	—	September 17, 2009	Catalina	CSS	·	1.4 km	MPC · JPL
457854	2009 SQ_{170}	—	September 17, 2009	Catalina	CSS	·	3.1 km	MPC · JPL
457855	2009 SH_{172}	—	September 19, 2009	Kitt Peak	Spacewatch	·	1.8 km	MPC · JPL
457856	2009 SR_{173}	—	September 18, 2009	Catalina	CSS	(18466)	2.5 km	MPC · JPL
457857	2009 SL_{175}	—	September 19, 2009	Kitt Peak	Spacewatch	H	550 m	MPC · JPL
457858	2009 SU_{179}	—	February 28, 2008	Kitt Peak	Spacewatch	·	1.4 km	MPC · JPL
457859	2009 SL_{190}	—	September 22, 2009	Kitt Peak	Spacewatch	·	2.0 km	MPC · JPL
457860	2009 SO_{192}	—	September 22, 2009	Kitt Peak	Spacewatch	·	2.2 km	MPC · JPL
457861	2009 SX_{192}	—	December 2, 2005	Mount Lemmon	Mount Lemmon Survey	AGN	950 m	MPC · JPL
457862	2009 SO_{194}	—	September 22, 2009	Kitt Peak	Spacewatch	·	2.7 km	MPC · JPL
457863	2009 SB_{201}	—	October 4, 2004	Kitt Peak	Spacewatch	KOR	1.2 km	MPC · JPL
457864	2009 SM_{215}	—	September 24, 2009	Kitt Peak	Spacewatch	·	3.1 km	MPC · JPL
457865	2009 SD_{219}	—	September 15, 2009	Kitt Peak	Spacewatch	·	1.7 km	MPC · JPL
457866	2009 SB_{220}	—	September 24, 2009	Mount Lemmon	Mount Lemmon Survey	EOS	1.8 km	MPC · JPL
457867	2009 SC_{222}	—	August 17, 2009	Kitt Peak	Spacewatch	·	1.5 km	MPC · JPL
457868	2009 SC_{223}	—	September 25, 2009	Mount Lemmon	Mount Lemmon Survey	GEF	1.3 km	MPC · JPL
457869	2009 SY_{240}	—	September 18, 2009	Catalina	CSS	·	2.8 km	MPC · JPL
457870	2009 SK_{243}	—	September 15, 2009	Catalina	CSS	·	2.6 km	MPC · JPL
457871	2009 SX_{248}	—	September 16, 2009	Kitt Peak	Spacewatch	·	1.8 km	MPC · JPL
457872	2009 SF_{252}	—	April 7, 2003	Kitt Peak	Spacewatch	·	2.0 km	MPC · JPL
457873	2009 SG_{254}	—	September 16, 2009	Kitt Peak	Spacewatch	·	1.6 km	MPC · JPL
457874	2009 SQ_{261}	—	September 22, 2009	Kitt Peak	Spacewatch	H	590 m	MPC · JPL
457875	2009 SN_{278}	—	February 21, 2007	Kitt Peak	Spacewatch	·	2.4 km	MPC · JPL
457876	2009 SA_{281}	—	September 17, 2009	Kitt Peak	Spacewatch	HOF	2.4 km	MPC · JPL
457877	2009 SO_{287}	—	September 25, 2009	Kitt Peak	Spacewatch	·	1.6 km	MPC · JPL
457878	2009 SD_{288}	—	September 17, 2009	Kitt Peak	Spacewatch	·	2.1 km	MPC · JPL
457879	2009 SE_{289}	—	September 17, 2009	Kitt Peak	Spacewatch	·	1.7 km	MPC · JPL
457880	2009 SF_{303}	—	September 16, 2009	Mount Lemmon	Mount Lemmon Survey	·	1.8 km	MPC · JPL
457881	2009 SG_{322}	—	August 28, 2009	Kitt Peak	Spacewatch	·	1.6 km	MPC · JPL
457882	2009 SH_{327}	—	September 25, 2009	Catalina	CSS	·	3.2 km	MPC · JPL
457883	2009 SS_{338}	—	September 17, 2009	Mount Lemmon	Mount Lemmon Survey	·	2.8 km	MPC · JPL
457884	2009 SE_{339}	—	September 23, 2009	Mount Lemmon	Mount Lemmon Survey	TIR	2.3 km	MPC · JPL
457885	2009 SJ_{344}	—	September 18, 2009	Kitt Peak	Spacewatch	·	2.7 km	MPC · JPL
457886	2009 SP_{347}	—	September 28, 2009	Mount Lemmon	Mount Lemmon Survey	·	1.4 km	MPC · JPL
457887	2009 SG_{350}	—	September 22, 2009	Mount Lemmon	Mount Lemmon Survey	·	1.8 km	MPC · JPL
457888	2009 SM_{354}	—	September 21, 2009	Mount Lemmon	Mount Lemmon Survey	·	1.9 km	MPC · JPL
457889	2009 SJ_{357}	—	September 21, 2009	Mount Lemmon	Mount Lemmon Survey	·	2.1 km	MPC · JPL
457890	2009 TZ_{3}	—	November 22, 2004	Campo Imperatore	CINEOS	EOS	1.5 km	MPC · JPL
457891	2009 TR_{12}	—	September 12, 2009	Kitt Peak	Spacewatch	·	2.4 km	MPC · JPL
457892	2009 TE_{14}	—	October 11, 2009	Mount Lemmon	Mount Lemmon Survey	·	1.6 km	MPC · JPL
457893	2009 TJ_{19}	—	October 11, 2009	Mount Lemmon	Mount Lemmon Survey	·	1.8 km	MPC · JPL
457894	2009 TY_{23}	—	October 14, 2009	Goodricke-Pigott	R. A. Tucker	H	610 m	MPC · JPL
457895	2009 TK_{25}	—	October 14, 2009	Mount Lemmon	Mount Lemmon Survey	H	610 m	MPC · JPL
457896	2009 TW_{30}	—	December 24, 2005	Kitt Peak	Spacewatch	AGN	1.1 km	MPC · JPL
457897	2009 TC_{32}	—	September 28, 2009	Mount Lemmon	Mount Lemmon Survey	·	4.5 km	MPC · JPL
457898	2009 TD_{32}	—	October 13, 2009	Socorro	LINEAR	·	1.8 km	MPC · JPL
457899	2009 TJ_{33}	—	September 20, 2009	Kitt Peak	Spacewatch	·	3.2 km	MPC · JPL
457900	2009 TE_{37}	—	September 21, 2009	Kitt Peak	Spacewatch	·	910 m	MPC · JPL

== 457901–458000 ==
back to top

Designation			Discovery			Properties		Ref
Permanent	Provisional	Named after	Date	Site	Discoverer(s)	Category	Diam.	Ref
457901	2009 TM_{42}	—	October 11, 2009	Mount Lemmon	Mount Lemmon Survey	·	2.6 km	MPC · JPL
457902	2009 TD_{46}	—	October 1, 2009	Mount Lemmon	Mount Lemmon Survey	·	3.6 km	MPC · JPL
457903	2009 TG_{48}	—	October 14, 2009	Mount Lemmon	Mount Lemmon Survey	·	2.4 km	MPC · JPL
457904	2009 UA_{6}	—	September 17, 2009	Kitt Peak	Spacewatch	EOS	1.6 km	MPC · JPL
457905	2009 UG_{6}	—	October 24, 2005	Kitt Peak	Spacewatch	·	1.2 km	MPC · JPL
457906	2009 UR_{7}	—	November 26, 2005	Mount Lemmon	Mount Lemmon Survey	AGN	1.0 km	MPC · JPL
457907	2009 UD_{10}	—	September 18, 2009	Kitt Peak	Spacewatch	THM	1.7 km	MPC · JPL
457908	2009 UA_{13}	—	October 1, 2009	Mount Lemmon	Mount Lemmon Survey	·	3.6 km	MPC · JPL
457909	2009 UY_{14}	—	September 28, 2009	Mount Lemmon	Mount Lemmon Survey	·	1.8 km	MPC · JPL
457910	2009 UH_{16}	—	October 18, 2009	La Sagra	OAM	·	4.0 km	MPC · JPL
457911	2009 UT_{17}	—	October 19, 2009	Mayhill	Lowe, A.	·	2.3 km	MPC · JPL
457912	2009 UW_{18}	—	October 23, 2009	Socorro	LINEAR	APO	420 m	MPC · JPL
457913	2009 UN_{27}	—	October 21, 2009	Mount Lemmon	Mount Lemmon Survey	HOF	2.5 km	MPC · JPL
457914	2009 UP_{28}	—	September 22, 2009	Mount Lemmon	Mount Lemmon Survey	·	3.8 km	MPC · JPL
457915	2009 UU_{28}	—	October 18, 2009	Mount Lemmon	Mount Lemmon Survey	EOS	1.8 km	MPC · JPL
457916	2009 UU_{34}	—	October 21, 2009	Mount Lemmon	Mount Lemmon Survey	LIX	3.7 km	MPC · JPL
457917	2009 UH_{43}	—	September 18, 2009	Kitt Peak	Spacewatch	·	1.7 km	MPC · JPL
457918	2009 UZ_{45}	—	September 22, 2009	Mount Lemmon	Mount Lemmon Survey	EOS	1.9 km	MPC · JPL
457919	2009 UR_{46}	—	October 18, 2009	Mount Lemmon	Mount Lemmon Survey	·	1.7 km	MPC · JPL
457920	2009 UT_{47}	—	October 18, 2009	Kitt Peak	Spacewatch	·	2.3 km	MPC · JPL
457921	2009 UN_{56}	—	September 16, 2009	Mount Lemmon	Mount Lemmon Survey	·	2.9 km	MPC · JPL
457922	2009 UQ_{75}	—	September 24, 2009	Kitt Peak	Spacewatch	·	2.1 km	MPC · JPL
457923	2009 UO_{79}	—	November 10, 1999	Kitt Peak	Spacewatch	EOS	2.0 km	MPC · JPL
457924	2009 UU_{82}	—	October 23, 2009	Mount Lemmon	Mount Lemmon Survey	·	1.4 km	MPC · JPL
457925	2009 UJ_{90}	—	October 26, 2009	La Sagra	OAM	H	680 m	MPC · JPL
457926	2009 UX_{92}	—	October 17, 2009	Mount Lemmon	Mount Lemmon Survey	·	4.8 km	MPC · JPL
457927	2009 UA_{101}	—	October 23, 2009	Mount Lemmon	Mount Lemmon Survey	·	1.8 km	MPC · JPL
457928	2009 UU_{103}	—	September 20, 2009	Mount Lemmon	Mount Lemmon Survey	·	3.7 km	MPC · JPL
457929	2009 UC_{110}	—	October 23, 2009	Kitt Peak	Spacewatch	·	3.1 km	MPC · JPL
457930	2009 UY_{113}	—	October 4, 2004	Kitt Peak	Spacewatch	·	1.6 km	MPC · JPL
457931	2009 UV_{123}	—	October 26, 2009	Mount Lemmon	Mount Lemmon Survey	·	3.0 km	MPC · JPL
457932	2009 UE_{128}	—	October 25, 2009	Kitt Peak	Spacewatch	·	2.6 km	MPC · JPL
457933	2009 UE_{133}	—	October 21, 2009	Catalina	CSS	·	2.5 km	MPC · JPL
457934	2009 UO_{139}	—	September 20, 2009	Catalina	CSS	·	3.5 km	MPC · JPL
457935	2009 UN_{142}	—	October 18, 2009	Mount Lemmon	Mount Lemmon Survey	·	1.1 km	MPC · JPL
457936	2009 UW_{150}	—	October 23, 2009	Mount Lemmon	Mount Lemmon Survey	·	1.7 km	MPC · JPL
457937	2009 UL_{151}	—	October 17, 2009	Catalina	CSS	TIR	2.4 km	MPC · JPL
457938	2009 UL_{154}	—	October 26, 2009	Kitt Peak	Spacewatch	EOS	1.9 km	MPC · JPL
457939	2009 VG_{1}	—	November 9, 2009	Tzec Maun	D. Chestnov, A. Novichonok	ELF	3.9 km	MPC · JPL
457940	2009 VD_{2}	—	November 9, 2009	Socorro	LINEAR	·	3.6 km	MPC · JPL
457941	2009 VX_{2}	—	November 9, 2009	Socorro	LINEAR	·	2.9 km	MPC · JPL
457942	2009 VC_{9}	—	November 8, 2009	Mount Lemmon	Mount Lemmon Survey	·	2.0 km	MPC · JPL
457943	2009 VW_{11}	—	October 24, 2009	Kitt Peak	Spacewatch	EOS	1.9 km	MPC · JPL
457944	2009 VY_{15}	—	November 8, 2009	Mount Lemmon	Mount Lemmon Survey	·	1.5 km	MPC · JPL
457945	2009 VO_{28}	—	October 24, 2009	Catalina	CSS	·	3.4 km	MPC · JPL
457946	2009 VQ_{31}	—	October 26, 2009	Kitt Peak	Spacewatch	EOS	1.9 km	MPC · JPL
457947	2009 VK_{32}	—	November 9, 2009	Mount Lemmon	Mount Lemmon Survey	·	2.4 km	MPC · JPL
457948	2009 VB_{33}	—	November 9, 2009	Mount Lemmon	Mount Lemmon Survey	·	3.1 km	MPC · JPL
457949	2009 VT_{38}	—	October 22, 2009	Mount Lemmon	Mount Lemmon Survey	·	3.6 km	MPC · JPL
457950	2009 VY_{38}	—	October 22, 2009	Mount Lemmon	Mount Lemmon Survey	·	2.5 km	MPC · JPL
457951	2009 VB_{40}	—	October 30, 2009	Mount Lemmon	Mount Lemmon Survey	·	4.1 km	MPC · JPL
457952	2009 VG_{40}	—	September 21, 2009	Mount Lemmon	Mount Lemmon Survey	·	1.7 km	MPC · JPL
457953	2009 VF_{46}	—	October 18, 2009	Mount Lemmon	Mount Lemmon Survey	EOS	1.7 km	MPC · JPL
457954	2009 VX_{53}	—	October 24, 2009	Kitt Peak	Spacewatch	·	1.5 km	MPC · JPL
457955	2009 VH_{54}	—	October 24, 2009	Kitt Peak	Spacewatch	·	1.8 km	MPC · JPL
457956	2009 VJ_{63}	—	November 8, 2009	Kitt Peak	Spacewatch	·	1.6 km	MPC · JPL
457957	2009 VE_{65}	—	November 9, 2009	Kitt Peak	Spacewatch	EOS	1.8 km	MPC · JPL
457958	2009 VN_{65}	—	October 22, 2009	Mount Lemmon	Mount Lemmon Survey	·	2.4 km	MPC · JPL
457959	2009 VK_{67}	—	November 9, 2009	Mount Lemmon	Mount Lemmon Survey	·	4.7 km	MPC · JPL
457960	2009 VU_{67}	—	September 20, 2009	Mount Lemmon	Mount Lemmon Survey	·	3.9 km	MPC · JPL
457961	2009 VV_{69}	—	November 9, 2009	Mount Lemmon	Mount Lemmon Survey	·	1.8 km	MPC · JPL
457962	2009 VQ_{70}	—	October 17, 2009	Mount Lemmon	Mount Lemmon Survey	·	2.1 km	MPC · JPL
457963	2009 VL_{78}	—	November 9, 2009	Catalina	CSS	·	1.9 km	MPC · JPL
457964	2009 VM_{79}	—	November 10, 2009	Catalina	CSS	·	2.8 km	MPC · JPL
457965	2009 VB_{80}	—	September 25, 2009	Catalina	CSS	·	4.2 km	MPC · JPL
457966	2009 VQ_{83}	—	October 22, 2009	Mount Lemmon	Mount Lemmon Survey	·	3.5 km	MPC · JPL
457967	2009 VZ_{83}	—	November 9, 2009	Kitt Peak	Spacewatch	·	2.6 km	MPC · JPL
457968	2009 VR_{85}	—	September 20, 2009	Mount Lemmon	Mount Lemmon Survey	·	2.1 km	MPC · JPL
457969	2009 VE_{88}	—	October 26, 2009	Mount Lemmon	Mount Lemmon Survey	EOS	1.7 km	MPC · JPL
457970	2009 VH_{88}	—	November 10, 2009	Kitt Peak	Spacewatch	·	3.0 km	MPC · JPL
457971	2009 VV_{88}	—	September 27, 2009	Kitt Peak	Spacewatch	·	2.0 km	MPC · JPL
457972	2009 VO_{94}	—	November 9, 2009	Kitt Peak	Spacewatch	·	1.9 km	MPC · JPL
457973	2009 VV_{94}	—	November 9, 2009	Kitt Peak	Spacewatch	·	3.9 km	MPC · JPL
457974	2009 VX_{95}	—	September 21, 2009	Mount Lemmon	Mount Lemmon Survey	·	3.1 km	MPC · JPL
457975	2009 VG_{96}	—	September 21, 2009	Mount Lemmon	Mount Lemmon Survey	LIX	3.6 km	MPC · JPL
457976	2009 VX_{104}	—	November 9, 2009	Catalina	CSS	·	4.1 km	MPC · JPL
457977	2009 VB_{107}	—	November 8, 2009	Catalina	CSS	LIX	4.2 km	MPC · JPL
457978	2009 VE_{107}	—	July 28, 2007	Mauna Kea	P. A. Wiegert, N. I. Hasan	EOS	2.6 km	MPC · JPL
457979	2009 VD_{109}	—	May 27, 2008	Kitt Peak	Spacewatch	H	560 m	MPC · JPL
457980	2009 VK_{110}	—	November 10, 2009	Mount Lemmon	Mount Lemmon Survey	·	3.5 km	MPC · JPL
457981	2009 VS_{111}	—	October 14, 2009	Mount Lemmon	Mount Lemmon Survey	·	2.7 km	MPC · JPL
457982	2009 VY_{113}	—	November 8, 2009	Kitt Peak	Spacewatch	·	3.0 km	MPC · JPL
457983	2009 VD_{114}	—	November 9, 2009	Kitt Peak	Spacewatch	·	2.7 km	MPC · JPL
457984	2009 VC_{116}	—	November 10, 2009	Kitt Peak	Spacewatch	·	3.8 km	MPC · JPL
457985	2009 WG_{3}	—	November 16, 2009	Mount Lemmon	Mount Lemmon Survey	·	1.7 km	MPC · JPL
457986	2009 WU_{9}	—	November 19, 2009	Socorro	LINEAR	·	2.6 km	MPC · JPL
457987	2009 WC_{10}	—	November 19, 2009	Socorro	LINEAR	·	1.3 km	MPC · JPL
457988	2009 WF_{11}	—	November 19, 2009	Kitt Peak	Spacewatch	·	4.6 km	MPC · JPL
457989	2009 WV_{19}	—	November 17, 2009	Kitt Peak	Spacewatch	·	2.5 km	MPC · JPL
457990	2009 WS_{28}	—	November 8, 2009	Kitt Peak	Spacewatch	THM	2.1 km	MPC · JPL
457991	2009 WT_{31}	—	November 8, 2009	Kitt Peak	Spacewatch	·	2.6 km	MPC · JPL
457992	2009 WF_{32}	—	November 16, 2009	Kitt Peak	Spacewatch	·	1.8 km	MPC · JPL
457993	2009 WZ_{35}	—	November 17, 2009	Kitt Peak	Spacewatch	·	1.7 km	MPC · JPL
457994	2009 WP_{37}	—	November 17, 2009	Kitt Peak	Spacewatch	·	1.3 km	MPC · JPL
457995	2009 WB_{39}	—	November 17, 2009	Kitt Peak	Spacewatch	·	2.8 km	MPC · JPL
457996	2009 WP_{42}	—	November 17, 2009	Mount Lemmon	Mount Lemmon Survey	EOS	1.5 km	MPC · JPL
457997	2009 WN_{62}	—	November 16, 2009	Mount Lemmon	Mount Lemmon Survey	·	3.0 km	MPC · JPL
457998	2009 WK_{63}	—	November 16, 2009	Mount Lemmon	Mount Lemmon Survey	·	3.8 km	MPC · JPL
457999	2009 WK_{65}	—	November 17, 2009	Kitt Peak	Spacewatch	·	1.9 km	MPC · JPL
458000	2009 WP_{65}	—	October 23, 2009	Mount Lemmon	Mount Lemmon Survey	·	2.0 km	MPC · JPL

back to top

== Meaning of names ==
As minor planet discoveries are confirmed, they are given a permanent number by the IAU's Minor Planet Center (MPC), and the discoverers can then submit names for them, following the IAU's naming conventions. The list below concerns those minor planets in the specified number-range that have received names, and explains the meanings of those names.

Official naming citations of newly named small Solar System bodies are approved and published in a bulletin by IAU's Working Group for Small Bodies Nomenclature (WGSBN). Before May 2021, citations were published in MPC's Minor Planet Circulars for many decades. Recent citations can also be found on the JPL Small-Body Database (SBDB). Until his death in 2016, German astronomer Lutz D. Schmadel compiled these citations into the Dictionary of Minor Planet Names (DMP) and regularly updated the collection.

Based on Paul Herget's The Names of the Minor Planets, Schmadel also researched the unclear origin of numerous asteroids, most of which had been named prior to World War II. This article incorporates text from this source, which is in the public domain: SBDB New namings may only be added to this list below after official publication as the preannouncement of names is condemned. The WGSBN publishes a comprehensive guideline for the naming rules of non-cometary small Solar System bodies.

Named minor planet	Provisional	This minor planet was named for...	Ref · Catalog
457248 Hondius	2008 QH	Jodocus Hondius (Joost de Hondt, 1563–1612), a Flemish-Dutch engraver and cartographer.	IAU · 457248
457303 Daina	2008 SC_{8}	Daina in Lithuanian means a ‘song’. Lithuania is renowned for its traditional folk songs. This word is also used to denote a Lithuanian female name.	IAU · 457303
457743 Balklavs	2009 HW_{20}	Latvian radio astronomer Arturs Balklavs (1933–2005) was Director of the Radioastrophysical Observatory, Latvian Academy of Sciences, and Editor-in-Chief of the magazine Zvaigznota Debess (The Starry Sky). An outstanding promoter of science, a Prize of the Latvian Academy of Sciences is named after him.	JPL · 457743
457818 Ramírezmoreta	2009 RB_{58}	Pablo Ramírez Moreta (born 1983), Spanish researcher at the ESA's Planetary Defence Office.	JPL · 457818
