= Henricus (disambiguation) =

Henricus was a settlement in colonial America.

Henricus may also refer to:

== People ==
- Henricus (given name)
- Barney Henricus (1915–2007), Sri Lankan boxer and police officer, brother of Basil
- Basil Henricus (1922–2002), Sri Lankan boxer and army officer

== Other uses ==
- Henricus (moth)
