= António Calvário =

Portuguese singer, actor, and writer (born 1938)

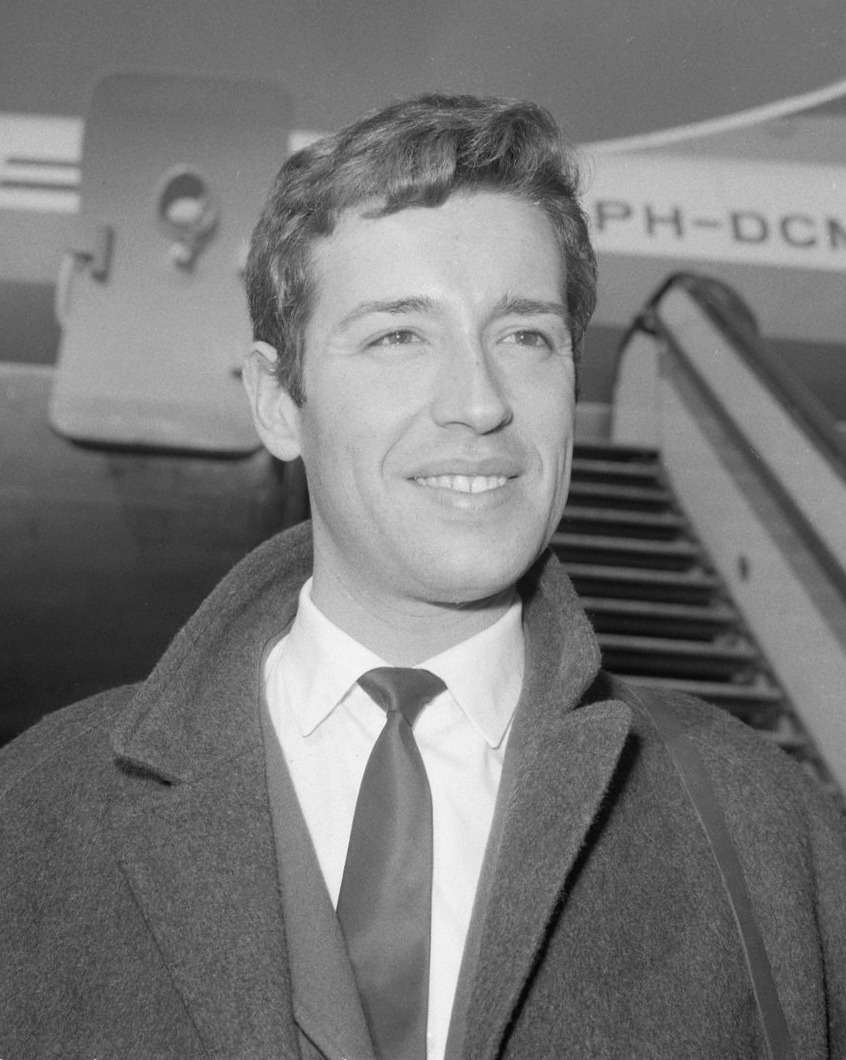
- Calvário in 1965
- Born: António Calvário da Paz; 17 October 1938 (age 88); Lourenço Marques, Portuguese Mozambique
- Education: Roque de Aguiar School; Academic College
- Occupations: Singer; actor; writer
- Works: Studio albums; compilation albums; extended plays; collaborations and other appearances; film; revues
- Parents: António da Paz; Adelaide Nunes Calvário
- Relatives: Rui Calvário da Paz (brother); Corina Freire (first cousin twice removed)
- Musical career
- Instrument: Vocals
- Years active: 1957–present
- Labels: A Voz do Dono; Alvorada; Belter; Black & Partners; Cartaz / Movieplay Digital; CBS; Columbia; Decca; DIS BRASIL; Edições Valentim de Carvalho; Essential Media Group; Ovação; Polydor; R.A.Music; Rossil; Solid Blue Group; Tecla; Videofono; Vidisco; Vila-Som; Vitória; World Music Records

António Calvário da Paz (born 17 October 1938) is a Portuguese singer, actor, and writer. A five-time winner of the national title of King of Radio, he is best known for winning the first edition of the Festival da Canção and representing Portugal at the Eurovision Song Contest in 1964 with the song "Oração", which was the country's debut entry in the contest. The artist has also made a significant contribution to the local revue scene.

== Early life ==
Calvário was born in Lourenço Marques, Portuguese Mozambique (now Maputo, Mozambique), at 9:30 a.m. on 17 October 1938. His parents were António da Paz (29 January 1890 – TBA), who was a mechanic from Estômbar, Portugal, and Adelaide Nunes Calvário (1912, 1913 or 1914 – 2004). He has a younger brother, Rui (born October 1942).

His father worked in Portimão and Setúbal, until he decided to sneak into the hold of the ship that brought him to Portuguese Mozambique, where he owned a small truck that transported goods between Lourenço Marques and Catembe and managed two sawmills in the interior of Marracuene. He eventually returned to Portugal, where he met and fell in love with Nunes Calvário. However, her family opposed their future marriage due to differences in social status, so the couple fled to Africa.

After moving to Vila Luísa at the age of five, Calvário began his studies at the Roque de Aguiar School (Portuguese: Escola Roque de Aguiar). There, he performed two songs, one from The Merry Widow and "Maria Helena", with his classmate, after the institution's headmaster asked him to participate in the final concert.

When Calvário was eight years old, he moved to Portugal with his family. After a month-long voyage aboard the Pátria, acquired by the National Navigation Company (Portuguese: Companhia Nacional de Navegação), which ended on 10 April 1949, they disembarked in Lisbon and then traveled to and stopped in Portimão, where the household reunited with the rest of its members.

Calvário completed his primary education with his aunt Rudolfa, then went on to the municipal high school and a college in Portimão. According to the singer, he had to perform at a party, because the school principal mistook him for another student, but he was supported by his piano teacher, Elisa Dutra, who appreciated his voice. As a result, he began studying singing at the age of fifteen, although his initial priority was the piano. In his fifth year of high school, the artist attended the Academic College (Portuguese: Colégio Académico) in Lisbon. There, the artist continued his music studies under the guidance of his grandmother's first cousin, Corina Freire, although his parents were originally opposed, as they planned for him to complete his studies, study law, and become a lawyer. The defining moment in his career was "a coin toss" that resulted in his musical ambitions prevailing.

== Career ==
=== 1957–1963: Debut in show business, Emissora Nacional, and first releases ===
In 1957, a group of Calvário's friends signed him up for an audition at the Emissora Nacional. He was eventually chosen, beating out more than 30 competitors with his performance of the song "Canta Brasil", earning him an exemption from training at the Centre for the Preparation of Artists for Radio (Portuguese: Centro de Preparação de Artistas para a Rádio). The singer started working the following year.

Having performed with the Tavares Belo Orchestra and participated in various shows since joining the Centre, in 1960, Calvário competed in the second edition of the Festival da Canção Portuguesa in Porto with the song "Regresso", written by Resende Dias and Maria Almira. In the end, he won the competition. The artist's victory was so overwhelming that he ended up going on tour both in Portugal and beyond. That same year, he signed a contract with the Portuguese record label Valentim de Carvalho, which was an obligation under the rules of the contest.

Calvário's first fee was 50 (escudos) for singing with Os Franceses on the radio programme Vozes de Portugal in Barreiro, and later each performance at the show Serões para Trabalhadores on the Emissora Nacional brought him 500 (escudos).

In 1961, Calvário won the title of King of Radio (Portuguese: Rei da Rádio) at the Coliseu dos Recreios in Lisbon. He repeated it in 1963, 1965, 1966, and 1972.

1963 was a breakthrough year for Calvário, as he acted in the revue Chapéu alto, staged at the Teatro ABC in Lisbon, marking his debut in this industry.

=== 1964–1977: Eurovision Song Contest, Festival da Canção, and expulsion from the stage ===
Calvário, pictured during the Eurovision Song Contest 1964 at the Tivolis Koncertsal in Copenhagen, Denmark, 1964

In 1964, Calvário was one of the six singers chosen by the Rádio e Televisão de Portugal (RTP) to take part in the inaugural edition of the Festival da Canção, the Grande Prémio TV da Canção Portuguesa 1964. Competing with two songs, "Oração", written by Rogério Bracinha, Francisco Nicholson, and João Nobre, and "Para cantar Portugal", by Tavares Belo, Jaime Filipe, and Artur Ribeiro, in the final on 2 February at the Estúdios do Lumiar in Lisbon, the former was declared the winner of the competition with a total of 79 points, while the latter scored only 11 points and finished sixth. Consequently, the artist earned the opportunity to represent Portugal at the Eurovision Song Contest 1964, held at Tivolis Koncertsal in Copenhagen, Denmark, with "Oração". It was the country's debut in the contest. However, his entire journey was difficult, as the participation of Spain and Portugal had been criticised due to the dictatorships of Franco and Salazar; students had been demonstrating outside their embassies in Copenhagen as soon as the competing nations were announced. As a result, only the singer himself went on behalf of the country's delegation. He was received in the host city by the Portuguese consul. The entry's conductor was Kai Mortensen, who approved of Nobre's arrangement, although there was a report from 7 March indicating that Belo would perform the role. On 21 March, the day of the contest itself, the organisers received alarming phone calls threatening anti-Franco strikes if Spain and Portugal appeared on stage. The panic reached its peak an hour before the broadcast began at 22:00 CET, when a report of a hidden time bomb was received, prompting the Copenhagen police chief to immediately mobilise an army of officers and firefighters to find it. The alarm turned out to be false, but a decision was made to deploy police during the festival; most of the officers were ordered to wear disguises to blend in with the crowd. In the Eurovision live show, Calvário performed eleventh and finished in thirteenth, last, place with "nul points", alongside entrants from Germany, Switzerland, and Yugoslavia. The boycotters still managed to make their mark during the event: a man trespassed onto the stage after the Swiss contestant's performance holding a banner that read "Boycot [sic] Franco & Salazar". At that moment, viewers were shown a shot of the scoreboard, and once the protester was removed by a television technician, the programme went on. The intruder was later arrested. Calvário also attended the aftershow party at the restaurant Ambassadeur and was awarded a silver trophy, along with the other fifteen competing acts. The Eurovision Song Contest 1964 is infamous for the fact that no complete video recording is known to have survived due, according to host broadcaster Danmarks Radio (DR), to the lack of tape machines at the studio, leaving the artist's performance available only in audio format. At the same time, a French record company showed interest in recording "Oração" and some of his songs in French, but Valentim de Carvalho did not give permission. On his return to Lisbon, the singer was greeted by thousands of fans.

Despite his unsuccessful participation in Eurovision the previous year, Calvário decided to enter the national selection Grande Prémio TV da Canção Portuguesa again in 1965. This time, he was the main performer of a total of three songs during the final on 6 February at the Estúdios do Lumiar in Lisbon, including "Por causa do mar" by Manuela de Moura Sá Teles Santos and José Pereira Mesquita, "Você não vê" by João Andrade Santos and Moura Sá Teles Santos, and "Bom dia" by Moura Sá Teles Santos and Pereira Mesquita. After the results sequence, none of them escaped the bottom three of the evening, while his workmate Simone de Oliveira emerged victorious and became the Portuguese entrant for the Eurovision Song Contest 1965 in Naples, Italy, at a later date.

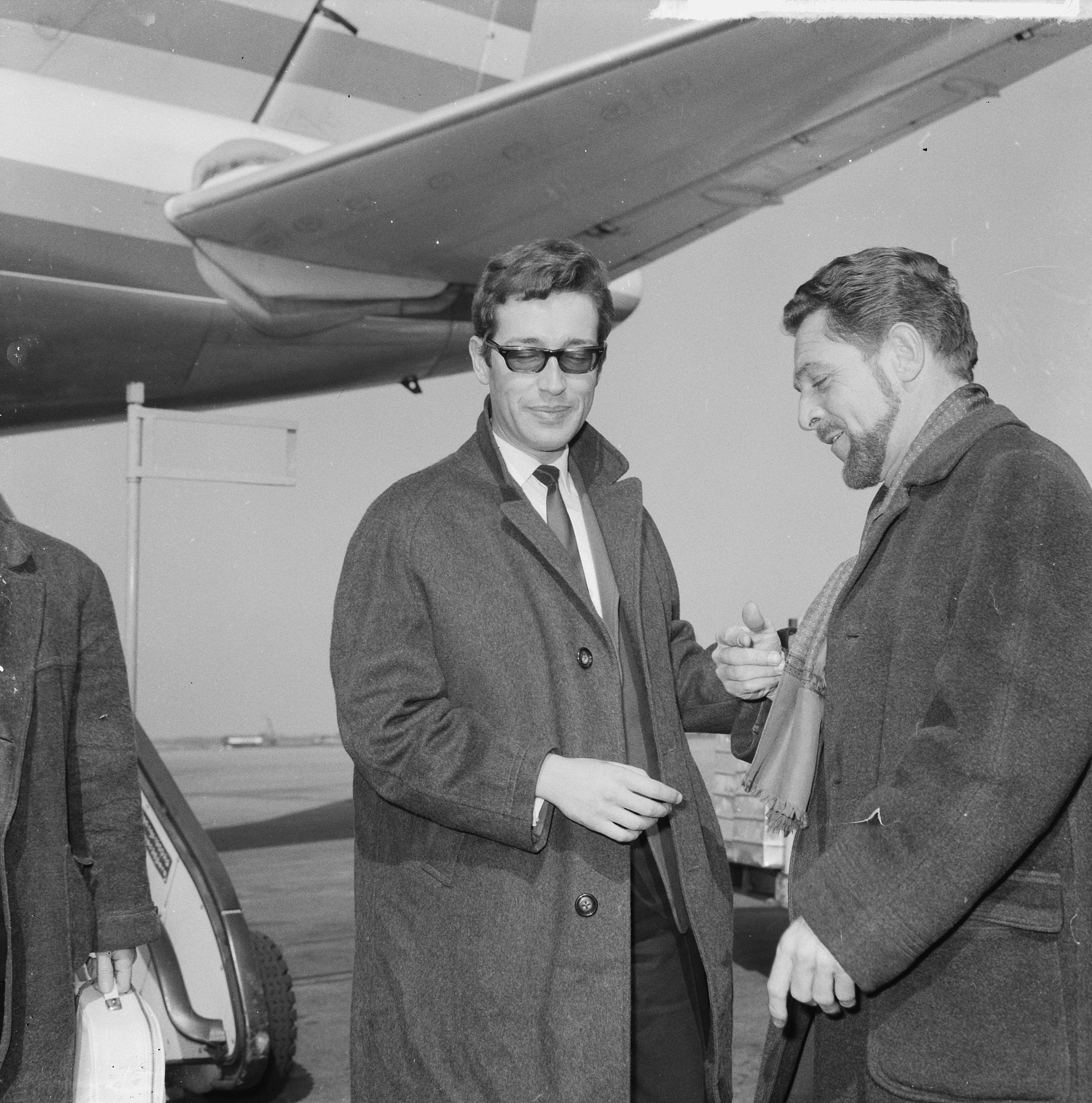
Calvário and Wim Ibo, pictured at Amsterdam Airport Schiphol in Amsterdam, the Netherlands, 1965

Following negotiations between Calvário and Dutch cabaret performer Wim Ibo, the artist, accompanied by two guitarists, travelled to the Netherlands in April 1965 to participate in his show called Cabaretkroniek, broadcast via the Vrijzinnig Protestantse Radio Omroep (VPRO). Greek singer-songwriter Kostas Hatzis also appeared on the same episode of the programme. According to Ibo, he invited them because he was "impressed by their singing" and wanted the Dutch people to "get to know them".

1966 saw another appearance for Calvário on the Grande Prémio TV da Canção Portuguesa. At the show of the third edition held on 15 January at the Estúdio C da Tóbis in Lisbon, his entry "Encontro para amanhã", created by Jerónimo Bragança and Carlos Nóbrega e Sousa, received 26 points and finished fifth. Instead, his close colleague Madalena Iglésias won the right to compete for Portugal at the Eurovision Song Contest 1966 in Luxembourg City, Luxembourg.

In 1968, Calvário took part in the Grande Prémio TV da Canção Portuguesa for the last time, with the song "O nosso mundo", written by Fernando Poitier and Fernando Vieira. He was not originally included in the final line-up that year, but eventually made it in after agreeing to replace Maria de Lourdes Resende, who was forced to withdraw due to a commitment in Mozambique. Ultimately, the artist finished last with two points at the festival on 4 March at the Estúdios do Lumiar in Lisbon; Carlos Mendes was chosen to perform for Portugal at the Eurovision Song Contest 1968 in London, the United Kingdom, at the end of the voting.

Festival da Canção performances and results (1964–1968)
Year	Date	Venue	R/O F	R/O SF	Song	Songwriter(s)	Final	Points	Semi	Points
1964	2 February 1964	Estúdios do Lumiar, Lisbon, Portugal	1	—N/a	"Oração"	Rogério Bracinha; Francisco Nicholson; João Nobre	1	79	No semi-finals	
1964	2 February 1964	Estúdios do Lumiar, Lisbon, Portugal	10	—N/a	"Para cantar Portugal"	Tavares Belo; Jaime Filipe; Artur Ribeiro	6	11	No semi-finals	
1965	6 February 1965	Estúdios do Lumiar, Lisbon, Portugal	1	—N/a	"Por causa do mar"	Manuela de Moura Sá Teles Santos; José Pereira Mesquita	6	13	No semi-finals	
1965	6 February 1965	Estúdios do Lumiar, Lisbon, Portugal	4	—N/a	"Você não vê"	João Andrade Santos; Manuela de Moura Sá Teles Santos	8 ◁	2	No semi-finals	
1965	6 February 1965	Estúdios do Lumiar, Lisbon, Portugal	8	—N/a	"Bom dia"	Manuela de Moura Sá Teles Santos; José Pereira Mesquita	7	6	No semi-finals	
1966	15 January 1966	Estúdio C da Tóbis, Lisbon, Portugal	6	—N/a	"Encontro para amanhã"	Jerónimo Bragança; Carlos Nóbrega e Sousa	5	26	No semi-finals	
1967	11 February 1967 (Semi-final 1); 18 February 1967 (Semi-final 2); 25 February 1967 (Final)	Estúdio C da Tóbis, Lisbon, Portugal	—N/a	4	"Deixa-me só"	Alberto Azevedo; Carlos Canelhas	Failed to qualify		4	44
1967	11 February 1967 (Semi-final 1); 18 February 1967 (Semi-final 2); 25 February 1967 (Final)	Estúdio C da Tóbis, Lisbon, Portugal	—N/a	6	"Vencerás"	Carlos Canelhas; Luís Simão	Failed to qualify		6 ◁	8
1968	4 March 1968	Estúdios do Lumiar, Lisbon, Portugal	7	—N/a	"O nosso mundo"	Fernando Poitier; Fernando Vieira	10 ◁	2	No semi-finals	

Calvário was reportedly stated to represent Portugal among men at the inaugural edition of the Festival de la Canción Latina en el mundo in Buenos Aires, Argentina, on 3 April 1968, but it was subsequently cancelled and postponed due to a dispute between its organiser Piero Bonino and TV companies. Nevertheless, RTP selected the performer again to compete for the country. At the rescheduled event, held at the Teatro Ferrocarrilero in Mexico City, Mexico, from 19 to 23 March 1969, he sang "Canção da juventude", written by Pedro Jordão and Joaquim Pedro Gonçalves, and "Terra de flores", accompanied by an orchestra conducted by Franck Pourcel. The former took fourth place with 201 points in the competition, making Calvário the best singer from a European country that year.

Also in 1969, Calvário co-produced and starred in Constantino Esteves' film O diabo era outro. However, it suffered a major financial setback, as it was severely delayed, reducing the original budget of 2,000–2,500 to 4,000 contos. The singer had to take out a bank loan for 2,000 contos, which he later repaid by performing "wherever they would give me work", including circus shows.

Calvário's career took a sharp decline after the overthrow of the Estado Novo regime, sparked by the Carnation Revolution across continental Portugal on 25 April 1974, shortly before which the artist himself attended the premiere of a revue in Porto. The coup led to his association with the Salazar era. He was no longer invited to take part in shows and revues, forcing him to survive by singing in dubious cabarets, bars, and circuses.

In September 1976, Calvário performed at the Portuguese restaurant Fado in Luxembourg City, Luxembourg, to celebrate its opening.

=== 1978–2007: "Mocidade, mocidade", grand return, and local activity ===
After four years of the national exile, Calvário made a comeback on 17 February 1978, appearing in the revue Põe-te na bicha at the Teatro ABC in Lisbon, where he performed the song "Mocidade, mocidade". It was written the previous year by Nuno Nazareth Fernandes, a significant figure in Portuguese music known for his leftist views, and Carlos Coelho, in an attempt to shed the stigma that he had acquired. The return was successful and grandiose, as by the end of the 1970s, the artist had been featured in as many as two revues, Direita volver and A invasão, at the Teatro da Trindade in Lisbon.

In 2003, journalist Luis Guimarães published a biographical book about Calvário called António Calvário: a canção de uma vida through the Garrido Editores.

Calvário participated in an episode of TVI's programme Circo das Celebridades, which was aired on 19 March 2006. The show features local celebrities testing their circus skills, and the performer later said that "it was an unexpected invitation, but one that I would never have turned down".

=== 2008–present: Histórias da minha vida, guest appearances, and later years ===
In March 2008, Calvário celebrated the fiftieth anniversary of the beginning of his professional music career: he released the CD Nos palcos da vida with two previously unreleased songs "Cheguei estou aqui" and "Só a cantar", written by Ondina Santos and Vítor Talhadas (the challenge was proposed by Carlos Pacheco, president of the Boa Esperança community), and his autobiography Histórias da minha vida, through the Editora Guerra & Paz, to mark the occasion.

Calvário and Simone de Oliveira made an appearance on stage during the final of the Festival da Canção 2014, which took place at the Convent of Beato António in Lisbon on 15 March 2014.

The following year, on 3 March 2015, Calvário and Suzy opened the first semi-final of the Festival da Canção 2015 at the RTP Estúdio 1 in Lisbon. In September of that same year, he concluded in an interview with ESC PORTUGAL that the festival should prioritise famous names, explaining that in its early years, "the big names caused a great stir", unlike in the later era.

2018 marked the launch of a two-hour revue titled Volta a Portugal em revista, directed by Renato Pino and featuring Calvário and Natalina José. The show has been performed throughout Portugal, including in cities such as Caldas da Rainha, Estremoz, and Lavradio.

Calvário appeared as a guest in the first semi-final of the Festival da Canção 2024 at the RTP Estúdios in Lisbon on 24 February 2024. Later, on 30 October, the radio station Antena 1, owned by RTP, premiered the episode of the podcast Postal do Dia, dedicated to the singer's life.

On 16 October 2026, on the eve of his 88th birthday, Calvário was awarded a municipal medal for services to culture by the then mayor of Lisbon, Carlos Moedas, in the Hall of Honour at the City Hall.

== Personal life and political views ==
As a Catholic who attends Mass only when inclined, Calvário expresses tolerance towards same-sex marriage, stating that "homosexuality can be an option, a way of life that dates back to the dawn of humanity". Speaking about abortion, the artist calls it a "necessary evil". He also distrusts the Internet, adding that it is a "double-edged sword that has allowed for very serious situations, dangerous encounters, kidnappings, child pornography, undue exposure of privacy, truly criminal fabrications", but believes that cloning and artificial insemination do not contradict "the laws of the Bible" and approves of organ transplantation.

Calvário has never been married, but he has had girlfriends, relationships with whom he has carefully concealed to protect his private life, explaining that "it was very complicated for an artist to be married". In 2023, the singer stated that "after a certain age", he wanted to avoid "prisons" and "be free", calling getting "married from time to time" the best system since "nobody is imprisoned".

In May 2025, over 70 past Eurovision participants, including Calvário, signed an open letter to the European Broadcasting Union (EBU) demanding that Israel be banned from the contest, accusing the Israeli Public Broadcasting Corporation (IPBC/Kan), the country's participating broadcaster, of being "complicit in Israel's genocide against the Palestinians in Gaza", referring to the humanitarian crisis caused by Israel's actions in the Gaza war.

Calvário currently owns two houses in Aroeira, located in Costa da Caparica, the land for which he purchased in the first half of the 2010s, and Portimão. Prior to this, the artist lived in central Lisbon during the heyday of his career, and later, for a time, with his mother in Aroeira until her death.

== Legacy ==
On 4 April 2021, Simão Oliveira performed Calvário's hit "Mocidade, mocidade" during the third gala of the second season of the Portuguese version of The Voice Kids. As a result, he reached the semi-final of the competition, where he made it to the final stage on 18 April, which the participant, mentored by Fernando Daniel, ultimately won, earning a contract with Universal Music Portugal and the right to represent Portugal at the Junior Eurovision Song Contest 2021 in Paris, France.

== Discography ==
Calvário

Credits are adapted from an online biography, Discorama, the Fonoteca Municipal do Porto website, Spotify, and Apple Music.

=== Studio albums ===
List of albums, with selected details
Title	Details
Sarilho de fraldas (Original Soundtrack) [2022 Remaster] (with Jorge Costa Pinto Orchestra and Madalena Iglésias)	Released: 1967; Label: Essential Media Group
António Calvário	Released: 1977; Label: DIS BRASIL
Canta a vida	Released: 1979; Label: Vila-Som
António Calvário	Released: 1992; Label: Ovação
António Calvário - essencial António Calvário	Released: 2006; Label: Edições Valentim de Carvalho
António Calvário - essencial António Calvário	Released: 2014; Label: Edições Valentim de Carvalho
Fados	Released: 2018; Label: Cartaz / Movieplay Digital
Regresso	Released: Unknown; Label: A Voz do Dono

=== Compilation albums ===
List of compilation albums, with selected details
Title	Details
Regresso - o melhor de António Calvário 1960 - 1966	Released: 1966; Label: Edições Valentim de Carvalho
Regresso - o melhor de António Calvário 1960 - 1966	Released: 2008; Label: Edições Valentim de Carvalho

=== Extended plays ===
List of EPs, with selected details
Title	Details
II Festival da Canção Portuguesa Porto (with Maria de Lourdes Resende, Sivuca, and Trio Odemira): "Nasci contra o vento" (by Trio Odemira); "Amar é sina" (by Maria de Lourdes Resende and Sivuca); "Canção de embalar" (by Maria de Lourdes Resende); "Regresso" (with Sivuca)	Released: 1960; Label: A Voz do Dono; Catalogue number: 7LEM 3056
II Festival da Canção Portuguesa Porto (with Maria de Lourdes Resende, Sivuca, and Trio Odemira): "Nasci contra o vento" (by Trio Odemira); "Amar é sina" (by Maria de Lourdes Resende and Sivuca); "Canção de embalar" (by Maria de Lourdes Resende); "Regresso" (with Sivuca)	Released: 1974; Label: A Voz do Dono / Vila-Som; Catalogue number: 7LEM 3056
"Sem ti"; "Nunca é tarde"; "Sinceramente"; "De pé atrás"	Released: 1960; Label: A Voz do Dono; Catalogue number: 7LEM 3053
Melodias de Nóbrega e Sousa: "Vielas de Lisboa"; "Fio de esperança"; "Fim de romance"; "Nasci contra o vento"	Released: 1960; Label: Polydor; Catalogue number: 20685 EPH
O papá e a mamã (with Maria de Lourdes Resende): "Amanhã se Deus quiser"; "Melodia de Natal" (with Maria de Lourdes Resende); "O papá e a mamã" (with Maria de Lourdes Resende) (Georges Guétary cover); "Melodia do berço" (by Maria de Lourdes Resende)	Released: 1960; Label: A Voz do Dono / Edições Valentim de Carvalho; Catalogue number: 7LEM 3063
Carnaval do Estoril (with Maria de Lourdes Resende): "Carnaval do Estoril" (by Maria de Lourdes Resende); "Lua de mel no Estoril"; "Estoril, lindo Estoril"; "Onde o sol é oiro" (by Maria de Lourdes Resende)	Released: 1961; Label: A Voz do Dono / Edições Valentim de Carvalho; Catalogue number: 7LEM 3067
3º Festival da Canção Portuguesa (with Maria de Fátima Bravo): "Ontem e hoje" (by Maria de Fátima Bravo); "Oração para dois" (by Maria de Fátima Bravo); "De cá para lá"; "Porque voltei"	Released: 1961; Label: Decca / Edições Valentim de Carvalho; Catalogue number: PEP 1028
Melodias de sempre Nº3 (with Maria Cândida and Maria Fernanda Soares): "Rita e Manecas" (with Maria Fernanda Soares); "Fado do Hotel do Pinho"; "Canção da roupa branca" (by Maria Cândida); "A Triste Feia" (by Maria Fernanda Soares)	Released: 1961; Label: Columbia; Catalogue number: SLEM 2092
Oração de amor: "O nosso segredo"; "Serenata a Coimbra"; "Amor é dissabor"; "Oração de amor"	Released: 1961; Label: A Voz do Dono; Catalogue number: 7LEM 3058
O meu chapéu: "O meu chapéu"; "Aqui onde me vês"; "Caixa de música"; "Alta roda"	Released: 1961; Label: A Voz do Dono; Catalogue number: 7LEM 3081
3º Festival de Aranda do Douro (with Maria de Lourdes Resende, Gina Maria, and João Maria Tudela): "Eu vi minha mãe rezando" (by Maria de Lourdes Resende); "Porta fechada"; "Um caso ao acaso" (by João Maria Tudela); "Quero ir ao Douro" (by Gina Maria)	Released: 1962; Label: Decca / Lisboa Discos; Catalogue number: PEP 1037
3º Festival de Aranda do Douro (with Maria de Lourdes Resende, Gina Maria, and João Maria Tudela): "Dúvida"; "Poema ao amor" (by Maria de Lourdes Resende); "Canção para matar saudades" (by João Maria Tudela); "Canção do Douro" (by Gina Maria)	Released: 1962; Label: Decca; Catalogue number: PEP 1038
A terra (with Maria de Lourdes Resende and Maria Zé): "A terra" (with Maria Zé and Maria de Lourdes Resende) (Georges Guétary cover); "Põe o pé na pampulhinha" (by Maria de Lourdes Resende); "O teu aniversário" (with Maria Zé and Maria de Lourdes Resende); "Olha o papão"	Released: 1962; Label: A Voz do Dono; Catalogue number: 7LEM 3084
Desse amor melhor: "Agora"; "Cantiga de quem está só"; "Desse amor melhor"; "Maria dos olhos grandes"	Released: 1962; Label: A Voz do Dono; Catalogue number: 7LEM 3094
Perdão para dois: "Perdão para dois"; "Nossa Senhora do amor"; "La escalera"; "Tu nunca saberás"	Released: 1962; Label: A Voz do Dono; Catalogue number: 7LEM 3097
O dia mais longo: "O dia mais longo"; "Estou tão só"; "Canta comigo"; "Falsidade"	Released: 1963; Label: A Voz do Dono / Vila-Som; Catalogue number: 7LEM 3106
Fado Hilário: "Fado Hilário" (Augusto Hilário cover); "Tem pena Maria"; "Eu e Deus"; "Vuela, vuela hacia mí"	Released: 1963; Label: A Voz do Dono; Catalogue number: 7LEM 3107
Avé Maria dos namorados: "Avé Maria dos namorados"; "Prisioneiro"; "Regressou a primavera"; "Llorando me dormí"	Released: 1963; Label: A Voz do Dono; Catalogue number: 7LEM 3121
António Calvário com Los Guaireños (with Los Guaireños): "El cuchipe" (with Los Guaireños); "Na rua dos meus ciúmes" (with Los Guaireños); "Índia" (with Los Guaireños); "Pájaro chovy" (with Los Guaireños)	Released: 1963; Label: A Voz do Dono; Catalogue number: 7LEM 3124
Boas festas!: "Noite Santa" (Silent Night adaption); "Fim do ano"; "Sinos de Belém" (with José Manuel Machado) (Jingle Bells adaption); "O velhinho" (with José Manuel Machado)	Released: 1963; Label: A Voz do Dono / Edições Valentim de Carvalho; Catalogue number: 7LEM 3128
Ó meu Senhor: "Ó meu Senhor"; "El pecador"; "Glória in excelsis Deo"; "Bendíceme"	Released: 1964; Label: A Voz do Dono; Catalogue number: 7LEM 3129
Oração: "Oração"; "Notre Dame d'amour"; "Alma de boémio" (with Henriqueta Maya); "Tricana"	Released: 1964; Label: A Voz do Dono / Edições Valentim de Carvalho; Catalogue number: 7LEM 3131
Uma hora de amor (with Madalena Iglésias): "Eu nasci para cantar" (by Madalena Iglésias); "É tão bom amar" (with Madalena Iglésias); "Tu és o meu amor" (by Madalena Iglésias); "Sonho de amor" (by Madalena Iglésias)	Released: 1964; Label: Alvorada / Vila-Som; Catalogue number: AEP 60660
Uma hora de amor (with Madalena Iglésias): "Ou sim ou não"; "Sim errei"; "É tão bom amar" (with Madalena Iglésias); "Quando se fala de amor"	Released: 1964; Label: A Voz do Dono; Catalogue number: 7LEM 3133
António Calvário: "Sabor a sal"; "Ai de mim"; "Amor sem lei"; "Canção da vida"	Released: 1964; Label: A Voz do Dono; Catalogue number: 7LEM 3136
Natal de Belém: "Natal de Belém"; "Natal branco"; "Natal das crianças"; "Canção da despedida"	Released: 1964; Label: A Voz do Dono / Edições Valentim de Carvalho; Catalogue number: 7LEM 3137
António Calvário: "Meu coração de madeira"; "Tormento para dois"; "Mira como bailo yo"; "Nunca mais chega o meu dia"	Released: 1964; Label: A Voz do Dono; Catalogue number: 7LEM 3142
Rapazes de táxis: "O amor tem sempre um sitio p'ra morar"; "Não sei de ti"; "Abençoado amor (Bienvenido amor)"; "Amore, scusami"	Released: 1964; Label: A Voz do Dono; Catalogue number: 7LEM 3144
Fados: "Eu queria cantar-te um fado"; "Vamos voltar"; "Minha dor"; "Quero rir"	Released: 1964; Label: A Voz do Dono; Catalogue number: 7LEM 3143
Encontro para amanhã: "Encontro para amanhã"; "Esos ojitos negros" (Dúo Dinámico cover); "Sabor a nada" (Palito Ortega cover); "Aquela que eu amo"	Released: 1966; Label: A Voz do Dono / Edições Valentim de Carvalho; Catalogue number: 7LEM 3138
Música do filme "Sarilho de fraldas" (with Madalena Iglésias): "Meu velho amor"; "Num dia de sol" (with Madalena Iglésias); "Balança" (by Madalena Iglésias); "Balão dourado" (with Madalena Iglésias)	Released: 1966; Label: Tecla; Catalogue number: TE 1005
"Y háblame" (Javier Solís cover); "Un hombre que vale" (Gino Paoli cover); "El destino"; "Noviecita del colegio"	Released: 1967; Label: Belter / Vila-Som; Catalogue number: 51.778
Canções de Natal: "É Natal"; "O que quer dizer Natal"; "Lá longe o Natal"; "Há palavras esquecidas"	Released: 1967; Label: A Voz do Dono / Edições Valentim de Carvalho; Catalogue number: 7LEM 3179
Calendário – Dentro de outro mundo – Ao vento e às andorinhas – Pouco mais: "Calendário" (Tonicha cover); "Dentro de outro mundo" (Simone cover); "Ao vento e às andorinhas" (João Maria Tudela cover); "Pouco mais" (Nicolau Breyner cover)	Released: 1968; Label: Alvorada; Catalogue number: EP-60-1007
O nosso mundo – Canção ao meu piano velho – Balada para D. Inês – Verão: "O nosso mundo"; "Canção ao meu piano velho" (Simone cover); "Balada para D. Inês" (Quarteto 1111 cover); "Verão" (Carlos Mendes cover)	Released: 1968; Label: Alvorada / Vila-Som; Catalogue number: EP-60-1008
O mundo dos mares felizes – Cai a chuva – Feliz vagabundo – Alma vazia: "O mundo dos mares felizes"; "Cai a chuva"; "Feliz vagabundo"; "Alma vazia"	Released: 1968; Label: Alvorada; Catalogue number: EP-60-1020
Mame – Cabaret – Algarve de sonho – Encontro à noite: "Mame"; "Cabaret"; "Algarve de sonho"; "Encontro à noite"	Released: 1968; Label: Alvorada; Catalogue number: EP-60-1021
António Calvário: "Maria perdida"; "Oh imenso mar azul"; "Par a par"; "Deus criou-te para mim"	Released: 1968; Label: Alvorada; Catalogue number: EP-60-1031
António Calvário: "O sol voltará"; "Um barco vem no mar"; "Olhos de veludo"; "Vai mais devagar"	Released: 1968; Label: Alvorada / Vila-Som; Catalogue number: EP-60-1070
Canções da banda sonora do filme "O diabo era outro" (with Milú): "Tema do filme" (with Milú); "Desperta, Lisboa" (by Milú); "O diabo era outro"; "Sexy" (by Milú); "Cigano"	Released: 1969; Label: Alvorada; Catalogue number: LD-17-21
Chorona / A primeira pedra / Canção da juventude / Digam o que digam: "Chorona"; "A primeira pedra"; "Canção da juventude"; "Digam o que digam"	Released: 1971; Label: Alvorada; Catalogue number: EP-60-1320
António Calvário: "O grito do silêncio"; "Meu velho outono"; "Valeu a pena"; "Não passo bem a noite"	Released: 1972; Label: Alvorada / Vila-Som; Catalogue number: EP-60-1333
Aleluia por viver: "Aleluia por viver"; "Vais ser feliz"; "Roda mas não caias"; "Desenlace"	Released: 1972; Label: Alvorada / Vila-Som; Catalogue number: EP-60-1370
Vou ao norte: "Vou ao norte"; "Sonho lindo"; "Parabéns, parabéns querida"; "O vira"	Released: 1974; Label: Vila-Som
Mendigo: "Mendigo"; "Eu pecador"; "Viandante"; "Se fosses livre"	Released: 1977; Label: Vila-Som
As luzes desta cidade: "As luzes desta cidade"; "Anda viver a vida"	Released: 1978; Label: Vila-Som
A festa do emigrante: "A festa do emigrante"; "A marcha de Lisboa"	Released: 1978; Label: Rossil
Adeus Isabel: "Adeus Isabel"; "Santa Luzia"	Released: 1988; Label: CBS
Espace Essential Hits: "Nossa Senhora do amor - Original Mix"; "Tu nunca saberás - Original Mix"; "Perdão para dois - Original Mix"; "La escalera - Original Mix"	Released: 2014; Label: Black & Partners
Espace Essential Hits: "Nossa Senhora do amor - Original Mix"; "Tu nunca saberás - Original Mix"; "Perdão para dois - Original Mix"; "La escalera - Original Mix"	Released: 2014; Label: Solid Blue Group
"Ce monde" (Richard Anthony cover); "Namorados de domingo"; "Hello Dolly" (Louis Armstrong cover); "Regresso"	Released: Unknown; Label: A Voz do Dono; Catalogue number: 7LEM 3150
Marchas do Estoril (with Maria José Valério): "Marcha da Costa do Sol"; "Marcha do Arraial"; "Marcha do Estoril" (by Maria José Valério); "Santo António do Estoril" (by Maria José Valério)	Released: Unknown; Label: A Voz do Dono; Catalogue number: 7LEM 3168
Pop fado: "Pop Fado"; "A minha rosa"; "Maria Lisboa"; "Fado menor"	Released: Unknown; Label: A Voz do Dono; Catalogue number: 7LEM 3169
Cantar na estrada: "Cantar na estrada"; "Gostar por gostar"; "Sou ribatejano"; "Nostalgia"	Released: Unknown; Label: A Voz do Dono; Catalogue number: 7LEM 3171
Lisboa à noite (with Carlos Ramos, Simone, and Helena Tavares): "Coimbra" (by Simone); "Alfama" (by Carlos Ramos); "Lisboa antiga"; "Lisboa à noite" (by Helena Tavares)	Released: Unknown; Label: Decca; Catalogue number: PEP 1091
Canções de "My Fair Lady" (with Simone): "A rua onde mora meu bem"; "Eu dançaria assim" (by Simone); "O rei de Roma" (with Simone); "Um bocadinho só" (with Conjunto Sem Nome)	Released: Unknown; Label: Decca; Catalogue number: PEP 1095
Maria Mentira: "Vem meu bom amigo"; "Pingos da vida"; "Maria Mentira"; "Nos meus versos"	Released: Unknown; Label: Vitória; Catalogue number: VEP-0032

=== Single albums ===
List of single albums, with selected details
Title	Details
I Festival da Canção Latina no Mundo: "Terra de flores"; "Canção da juventude"	Released: 1969; Label: Alvorada; Catalogue number: N-97-38
Chorona / A primeira pedra: "Chorona"; "A primeira pedra"	Released: 1969; Label: Alvorada; Catalogue number: N-97-41
O meu nome é António: "O meu nome é António"; "Onde vais c'o barco"	Released: 1971; Label: Alvorada; Catalogue number: N-97-52
Hei companheiro! / Improviso à solidão: "Hei companheiro!"; "Improviso à solidão"	Released: 1974; Label: Alvorada; Catalogue number: N-S-97-84
António Calvário: "Avé-Maria"; "Digam o que digam"	Released: Unknown; Label: Alvorada; Catalogue number: N-97-40

=== Collaborations and other appearances ===
List of collaborations and other appearances, with selected details
Title	Details	Included song
Canções de encanto e emoção	Collaborator: Madalena Iglésias; Released: 1994; Label: R.A.Music	"É tão bom amar" (with Madalena Iglésias)
Melodias de sempre	Collaborator: Various Artists; Released: 1995; Label: World Music Records	"Marcha dos marinheiros"
Melodias de sempre	Collaborator: Various Artists; Released: 1995; Label: World Music Records	"Maldito fado"
Portugal Deluxe Volume 2: um cocktail swingante	Collaborator: Various Artists; Released: 1998; Label: Edições Valentim de Carvalho	"É tão bom amar" (with Madalena Iglésias)
Doces melodias vol. 1	Collaborator: Various Artists; Released: 2001; Label: Videofono	"As luzes desta cidade"
Doces melodias vol. 4	Collaborator: Various Artists; Released: 2002; Label: Videofono	"Lisboa azul e ouro"
Doces melodias vol. 6	Collaborator: Various Artists; Released: 2002; Label: Videofono	"Anda viver a vida"
Oceanos	Collaborator: Various Artists; Released: 2006; Label: Ovação	"Olá cidade"
Grandes vozes - cantores românticos	Collaborator: Various Artists; Released: 2006; Label: Ovação	"Olá cidade"
Vielas de Lisboa	Collaborator: Various Artists; Released: 2010; Label: Edições Valentim de Carvalho	"Maria Lisboa"
Óculos de sol	Collaborator: Various Artists; Released: 2010; Label: Edições Valentim de Carvalho	"É tão bom amar" (with Madalena Iglésias)
Óculos de sol	Collaborator: Various Artists; Released: 2010; Label: Edições Valentim de Carvalho	"Sabor a sal"
Made in Portugal 3	Collaborator: Various Artists; Released: 2011; Label: Ovação	"Mocidade, mocidade"
Clássicos da rádio	Collaborator: Various Artists; Released: 2011; Label: Ovação	"Mocidade, mocidade"
Lisboa	Collaborator: Various Artists; Released: 2012; Label: Ovação	"Marcha retrato de Lisboa"
Canções de sempre vol. I	Collaborator: Various Artists; Released: 2012; Label: Videofono	"Mocidade, mocidade"
Canções de sempre vol. II	Collaborator: Various Artists; Released: 2012; Label: Videofono	"As luzes desta cidade" (Note: For unknown reasons, the song is titled "As luzes da cidade" on this album.)
Natal em português	Collaborator: Various Artists; Released: 2018; Label: Edições Valentim de Carvalho	"Natal das crianças"
Natal em português	Collaborator: Various Artists; Released: 2018; Label: Edições Valentim de Carvalho	"Sinos de Belém" (with José Manuel Machado)
Fátima cantada em fado	Collaborator: Various Artists; Released: 2024; Label: Vidisco	"Salve, estrela do mar"

== Filmography ==
Credits are adapted from the MEMORIALE Cinema Português website.

=== Film ===
List of films, with selected details
Title	Year	Role
Uma hora de amor	1964	António Luís
Rapazes de táxis	1965	João
Sarilho de fraldas	1966	António
O amor desceu em pára-quedas	1968	Jorge
O diabo era outro	1969	Rui Mendonça
Longe da vista	1998	Himself

=== Revues ===
List of revues, with selected details
Title	Date	Venue	Ref.
Chapéu alto	1963	Teatro ABC, Lisbon	
Zero, zero, Zé - ordem p'ra pagar	1966	Teatro Variedades, Lisbon	
Esta Lisboa que eu amo	1966	Teatro Monumental, Madrid	
Duas pernas... 1 milhão	1967	Teatro Capitólio, Lisbon	
Peço a palavra!	1969	Teatro Variedades, Lisbon	
Põe-te na bicha	1978	Teatro ABC, Lisbon	
Direita volver	1979		
A invasão	1979	Teatro da Trindade, Lisbon	
Andamos todos ao mesmo!	1991		
Revista à vista	1992	Cinema Odéon, Lisbon	
Mais riso é o que é preciso!	2015		
Volta a Portugal em revista	22 March 2019	Pimpões, Caldas da Rainha	
Volta a Portugal em revista	14 September 2019	Teatro Bernardim Ribeiro, Estremoz	
Volta a Portugal em revista	24 November 2019	Sociedade Filarmónica Agrícola Lavradiense, Lavradio	
Calvário: uma vida de canções	2021–present		

== Cited sources ==
- Guimarães, Luis (2003). António Calvário: a canção de uma vida. Garrido Editores. ISBN 978-9728738969.
- Calvário, António (2008). Histórias da minha vida. Editora Guerra & Paz. ISBN 978-9898014993.

Awards and achievements
Preceded by none (Inaugural edition)	Festival da Canção winner 1964	Succeeded by Simone de Oliveira with "Sol de inverno"
Preceded by none (Debut entry)	Portugal in the Eurovision Song Contest; 1964	Succeeded by Simone de Oliveira with "Sol de inverno"
