= Guitolão =

Portuguese Guitolão
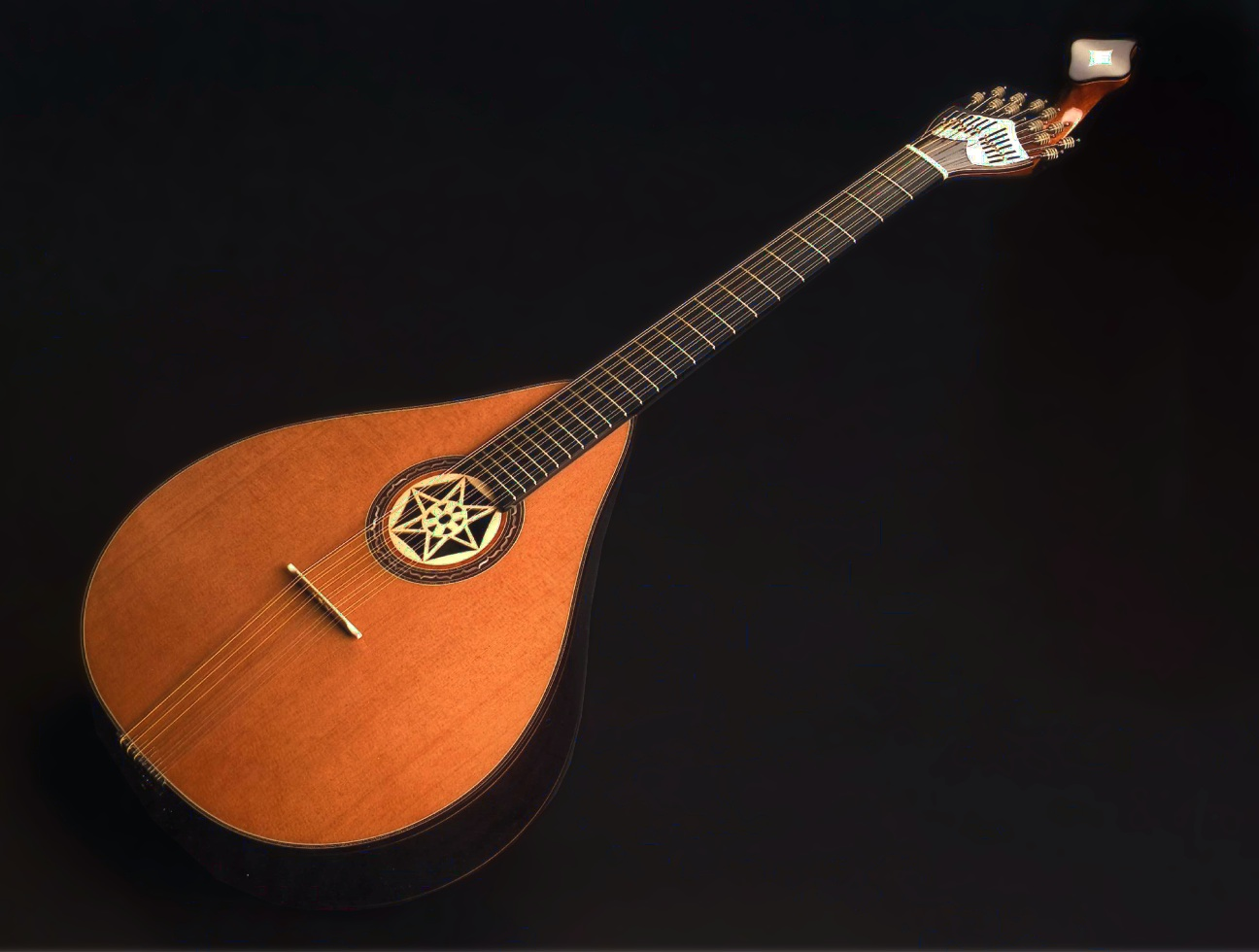
- Portuguese Guitolão by Gilberto Grácio

String instrument
- Classification: String instrument

Related instruments
- Portuguese guitarra – Guitar

The Guitolão is a chordophone designed by Portuguese luthier Gilberto Grácio. It is a baritone version of the Portuguese guitar.

== Terminology ==
The term Guitolão, is a portmanteau word combining syllables from the two Portuguese words guitarra and violão. The initial idea was to create an instrument similar to a Portuguese guitar but with a lower range, so that the soloist could dispense with the accompaniment of the violão, as done traditionally in fado.

== Background ==
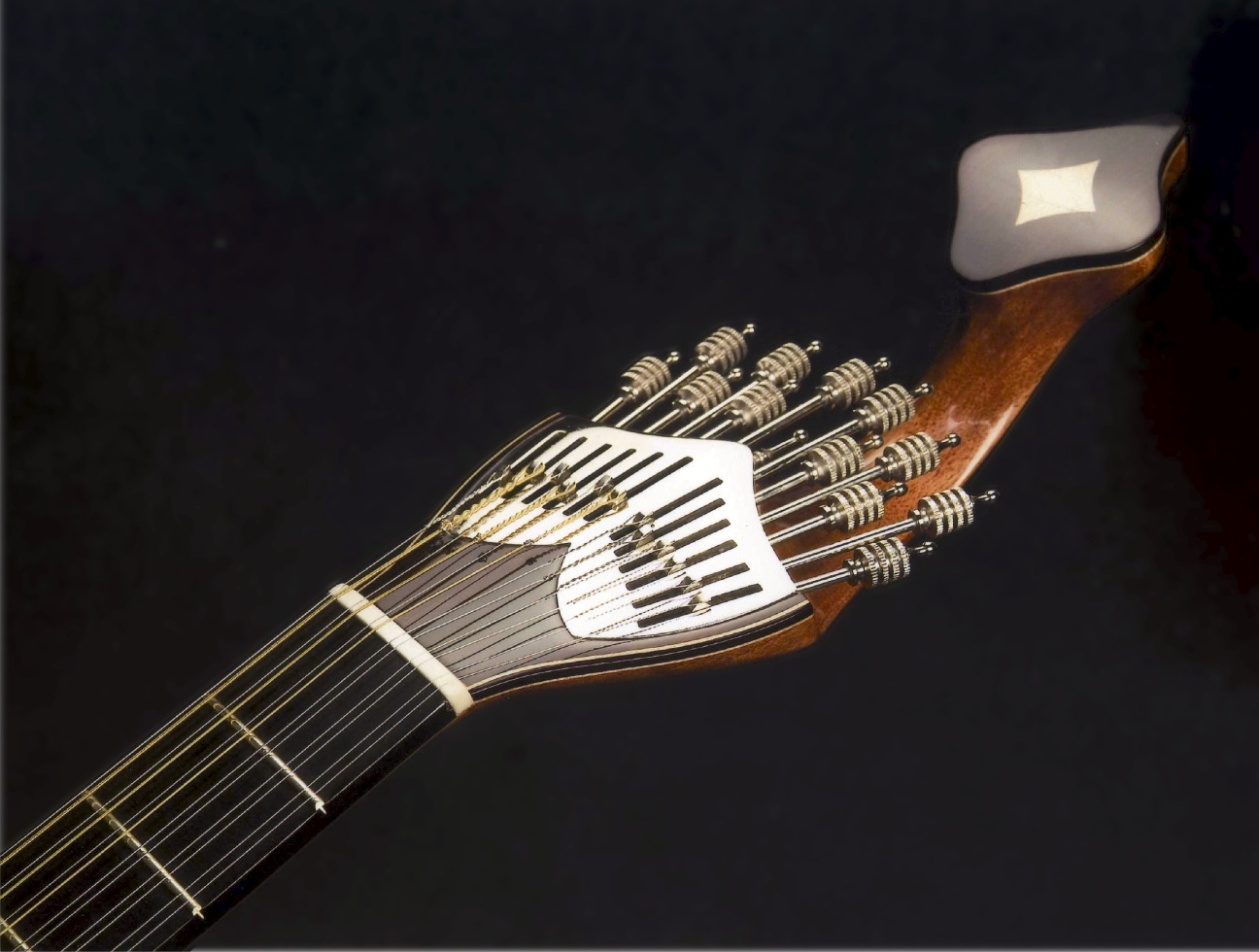
Portuguese Guitolão headstock

Grácio originally built a prototype for Carlos Paredes in 2001, and only three instruments were made. This solo instrument is rich in harmonics, largely due to the increased scale length of 24.4 inches (620 mm). Another important aspect is the dynamic response from the 12th fret of this instrument, unavailable from the normal Portuguese guitar. In essence, Guitolão is a baritone Portuguese guitar, tuned in low G.

== Tuning ==
The Guitolão is a twelve-stringed instrument mounted with six courses of double strings, and is usually tuned a fifth below the typical Lisbon guitar (three tones and a half), or a fourth below the Coimbra guitar, although other tunings are possible. Its standard tuning is, from high to low:
E4/E4; D4/D4; A3/A3; E4/E3; D4/D3; G3/G2.

== Description ==
The Guitolão is similar to the Portuguese guitar, with the following differences:

- A larger, pear-shaped body similar to some old English guitars built in the eighteenth century
- A wider body, about 0.78 inches (1.98 cm) larger than the Portuguese Lisbon guitar
- A longer fretboard, by 6 inches (15.24 cm) with 23 metal frets (13 on the neck and 10 on the soundboard)
- A longer neck
- Thicker string gauges
- A single piece floating bridge made of bone and wood
- A rosette on the sound hole

== See also ==
- Portuguese Guitar
- Bandolim
- Viola braguesa
- Rabeca
- Gaita transmontana
- Cavaquinho
