= Coimbra fado =

Portuguese music genre

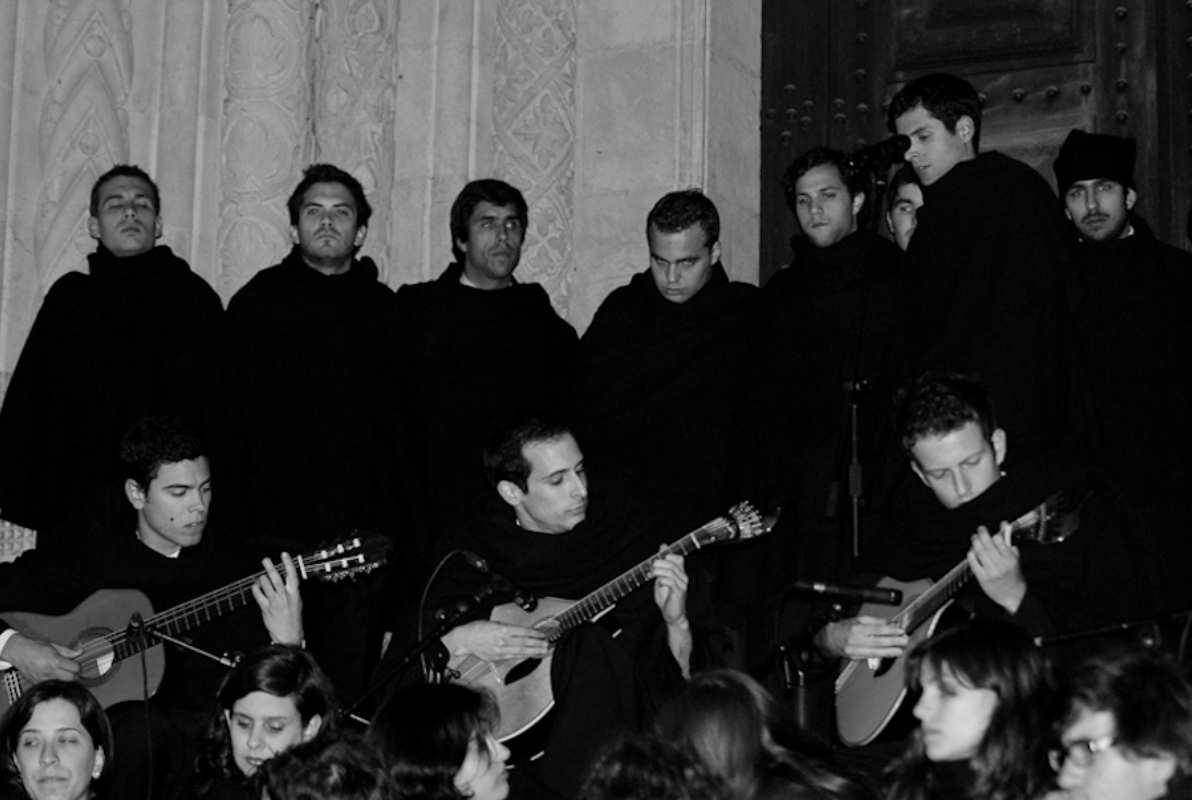
Fado group "Rapsódia" performing at "Serenata Monumental" (2010, Coimbra, Portugal)

Coimbra fado (Portuguese: Fado de Coimbra) is a genre of fado originating in the city of Coimbra, Portugal. While adopted by students at the University of Coimbra, and sometimes known as student fado (fado de estudante), it is usually considered the typical music of Coimbra itself. Developed from the Iberian lyric style of trovadorismo popular during the Middle Ages, the genre shares roots with Occitan troubadors.

Performed with the traditional Guitarra de Coimbra (a kind of Portuguese guitar originating in Coimbra), a modified version of Lisbon's fado guitar allegedly created by Artur Paredes, it is usually accompanied by classic acoustic guitar and male voices.

Guitarists Artur Paredes and his son Carlos Paredes are considered the pioneers and masters of this musical genre. Among its most renowned singers were Edmundo Bettencourt and António Menano, in the 1930s and 1940s, and José Afonso, Adriano Correia de Oliveira, Luís Goes and João Maria Tudela, in the 1950s and 1960s, the two so called "golden ages" of the genre. Other noted names in the genre include Loubet Bravo and Fernando Machado Soares.

The Coimbra Academic Association has a fado section, teaching the genre to musically inclined students and promoting musical projects and events related to it. Its fame throughout Portugal has led to the creation of similar structures in other cities, such as Lisbon and Porto, where there are also Fado de Coimbra groups organized by students and local people.

== See also ==
- Orfeon Académico de Coimbra

== Sources ==
- Broughton, Simon; Ellingham, Mark; Trillo, Richard (1999). World Music: Africa, Europe and the Middle East. Rough Guides. ISBN 978-1-85828-635-8.
- Manuel, Peter (1988). Popular Musics of the Non-Western World: An Introductory Survey. Oxford University Press. ISBN 978-0-19-506334-9.
- Roegiest, Anne-Marie; Spanoghe, Eugeen (1996). O Português através dos seus textos (in Brazilian Portuguese). Academia Press. ISBN 978-90-382-0090-3.
- Wilson, Thomas M. (30 November 2023). Europe: An Encyclopedia of Culture and Society [2 volumes]. Bloomsbury Publishing USA. ISBN 978-1-4408-5545-0.
