= List of number-one singles of 2002 (Portugal) =

The Portuguese Singles Chart ranks the best-performing singles in Portugal, as compiled by the Associação Fonográfica Portuguesa.

Week	Song	Artist	Reference
01/05/2002	"Can't Get You Out of My Head"	Kylie Minogue	
01/12/2002	"Can't Get You Out of My Head"	Kylie Minogue	
01/19/2002	"Walk On"	U2	
01/26/2002	"Walk On"	U2	
02/02/2002	"Somethin' Stupid"	Robbie Williams (with Nicole Kidman)	
02/09/2002	"Somethin' Stupid"	Robbie Williams (with Nicole Kidman)	
02/16/2002	"Can't Get You Out of My Head"	Kylie Minogue	
02/23/2002	"Can't Get You Out of My Head"	Kylie Minogue	
03/02/2002	"Somethin' Stupid"	Robbie Williams (with Nicole Kidman)	
03/9/2002	Out of Reach	Gabrielle	
03/16/2002	"Somethin' Stupid"	Robbie Williams (with Nicole Kidman)	
03/23/2002	"Touch Me"	Rui da Silva	
03/30/2002	"Lamb"	Gabriel	
04/06/2002	Freeek!	George Michael	
04/13/2002	Freeek!	George Michael	
04/21/2002	Freeek!	George Michael	
04/27/2002	Freeek!	George Michael	
05/04/2002	Freeek!	George Michael	
05/11/2002	"Tainted Love"	Marilyn Manson	
05/18/2002	"Lamb"	Gabriel	
05/25/2002	"Believe in Me"	Lenny Kravitz	
06/01/2002	"Lamb"	Gabriel	
06/08/2002	"Whenever, Wherever" / "Suerte"	Shakira	
06/15/2002	Marcha Do Sporting	Maria José Valério	
06/22/2002	"From Sarah with Love"	Sarah Connor	
06/29/2002	"Mundial"	Paulo Gonzo	
07/06/2002	"Marchas Populares"	Entre Vozes	
07/13/2002	"Quero Uma Casa Deste Tamanho"	Luis Represas	
07/20/2002	"Quero Uma Casa Deste Tamanho"	Luis Represas	
07/27/2002	"A Little Less Conversation"	Elvis Presley vs. JXL	
08/03/2002	"A Little Less Conversation"	Elvis Presley vs. JXL	
08/10/2002	"A Little Less Conversation"	Elvis Presley vs. JXL	
08/17/2002	"Quero Uma Casa Deste Tamanho"	Luis Represas	
08/24/2002	"A Little Less Conversation"	Elvis Presley vs. JXL	
08/31/2002	"A Little Less Conversation"	Elvis Presley vs. JXL	
09/07/2002	"A Little Less Conversation"	Elvis Presley vs. JXL	
09/14/2002	"A Little Less Conversation"	Elvis Presley vs. JXL	
09/21/2002	"Here I Am"	Bryan Adams	
09/28/2002	"The Ketchup Song"	Las Ketchup	
10/05/2002	"Underneath Your Clothes"	Shakira	
10/12/2002	"A Little Less Conversation"	Elvis Presley vs. JXL	
10/19/2002	"A Little Less Conversation"	Elvis Presley vs. JXL	
10/26/2002	"Whenever, Wherever" / Suerte"	Shakira	
11/02/2002	"Electrical Storm"	U2	
11/09/2002	"Electrical Storm"	U2	
11/16/2002	"Electrical Storm"	U2	
11/23/2002	"Electrical Storm"	U2	
11/30/2002	"Electrical Storm"	U2	
12/07/2002	"The Ketchup Song"	Las Ketchup	
12/14/2002	"Die Another Day"	Madonna	
12/21/2002	"Here I Am"	Bryan Adams	
12/28/2002	"Feel"	Robbie Williams	
