= FEUP Fado Group =

FEUP Fado Grupo (Grupo de Fado de Engenharia)
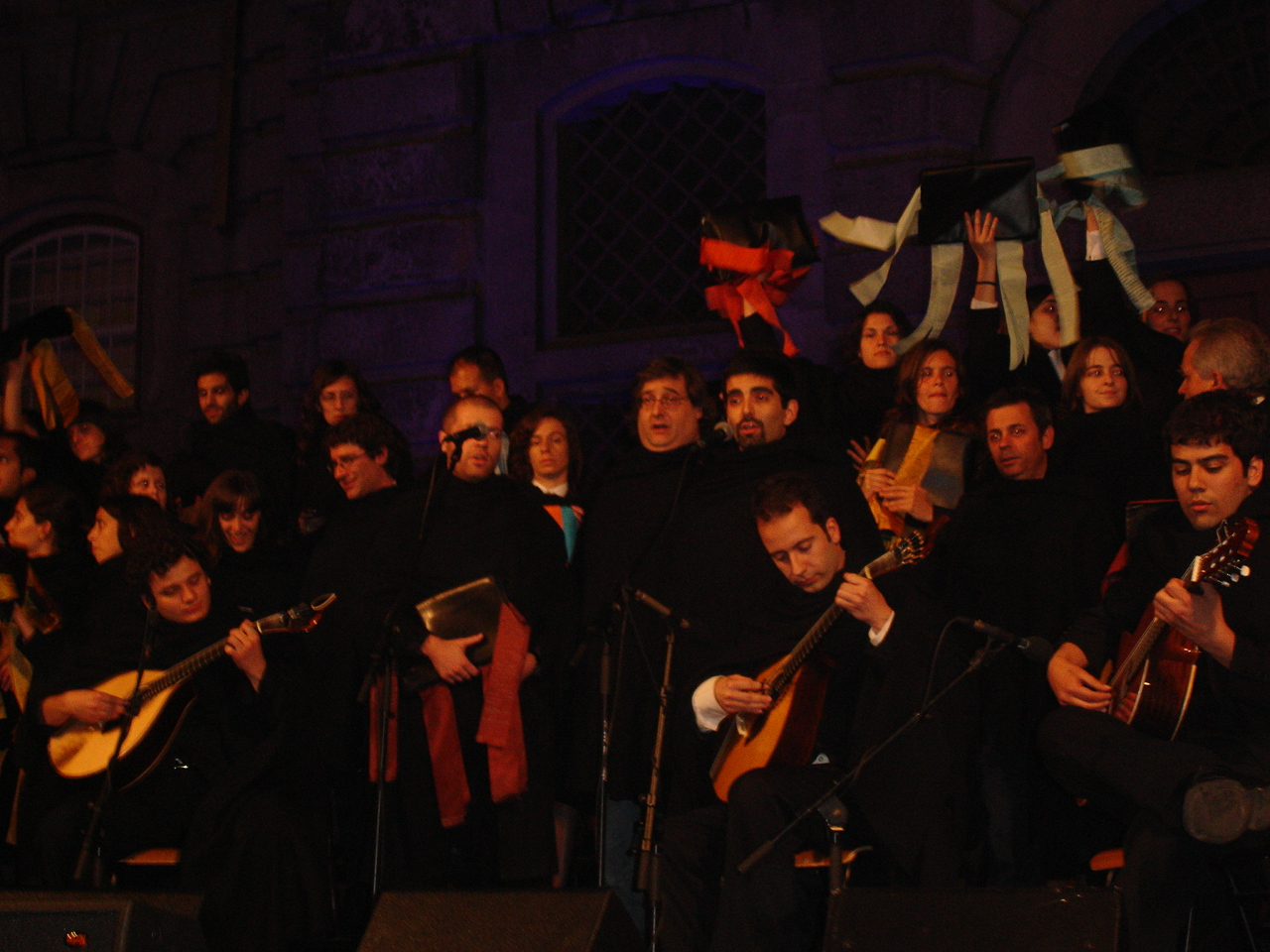
- Monumental Serenate of Porto 2008

Background information
- Origin: Porto, Portugal
- Genres: Fado
- Years active: 1988–present
- Labels: N/A
- Members: Diogo Sousa, Tiago Domingues, Vasco Patarata, Bruno Rafael, Daniel Correia, Filipe Vieira, Carlos Costa, Leonardo Moura, João Silva, Tiago Vicente, Pedro Diaz-Argüelles, Tiago Pires
- Website: www.grupodefadosdeengenharia.com

FEUP Fado Group is a Portuguese student group that performs Fado.

FEUP Fado Group started in 1988, from a group of students in FEUP, Engineering Faculty of Porto University (Faculdade de Engenharia da Universidade do Porto). Since then it has played Fado de Coimbra using voice, classic guitar and Portuguese guitar. Since its beginnings it has had several members that have come and gone, maintaining the group alive during the years.

== Style ==
FEUP Fado Group plays Fado de Coimbra a variation of Fado, a traditional Portuguese gender. It's normally sung by students and features three components, voice, classic guitar and Portuguese guitar.

== Discography ==
- Cantares D'Alma Lusa (1998)

1. Dança Palaciana
2. À Meia-Noite ao Luar
3. Meu Menino, Meu Anjo
4. Canção das Lágrimas
5. Traz Outro Amigo Também
6. Balada da Despedida do 5o Ano Jurídico 88/89
7. Variações em Ré menor no1
8. Branca Luz de Luar
9. Fado Para um Amor Ausente
10. Fado da Despedida
11. Crucificado
12. Estudo em Lá Maior
13. Cantar de Emigração
14. Fado Hilário
15. As Nossas Capas

- 20 anos (2008)

1. Canção Verdes Anos
2. À Meia-Noite ao Luar
3. É Preciso Acreditar
4. Os Vampiros
5. O Meu Menino
6. Variações em Lá Menor (Artur Paredes)
7. Samaritana
8. Canção Pagã
9. Canto do Amanhecer
10. Balada da Despedida do 5o Ano Jurídico 88/89
11. Canção da Despedida (As Nossas Capas)
12. Balada da Despedida de Engenharia
13. Trova de Amor Lusíada (participação conjunta dos grupos musicais da FEUP)

== Members ==
Since 1988 of history FEUP Fado Group has had several generations of musicians, which represent FEUP, Engineering Faculty of Porto University. The most recent formation is as follows:

- Diogo Sousa — portuguese guitar
- Tiago Domingues — portuguese guitar
- Vasco Patarata — classic guitar
- Bruno Rafael — classic guitar
- Daniel Correia — voice
- Filipe Vieira — portuguese guitar
- Carlos Costa — voice
- Leonardo Moura — voice
- João Silva — classic guitar
- Tiago Vicente — classic guitar
- Pedro Diaz-Argüelles — voice
- Tiago Pires — portuguese guitar

And lined up in the past with:

Miguel Godinho, voice; Francisco Boia, portuguese guitar; Fábio Moreira, classic guitar; José Fonseca, voice; Pedro Neto, classic guitar; Miguel Pereira, portuguese guitar; Tiago Botelho, voice; Ricardo Cleto, classic guitar; António Pinto, voice; João Bonita Loureiro, classic guitar; António Lisboa, voice; Manuel Soares, portuguese guitar; Adalberto Ribeiro, classic guitar; Gomes da Costa, voice; João Miguel, classic guitar; José Carvalho, classic guitar; Jorge Pacheco, portuguese guitar; José Liberal, portuguese guitar; Mário Henriques, portuguese guitar; Mário Rui, voice; Mário Vieira, voice; Miguel Assis, classic guitar; Miguel Silva, portuguese guitar; Nuno Oliveira, voice; Paulo Nunes, voice; Paulo Renato, voice; Pedro Columbano, voice; Pedro Correia, voice; Pedro Pimentel, portuguese guitar; Quim Passarinho, voice; Ricardo Ferreira, voice; Tiago Azevedo, voice;Vileda, classic guitar; Vítor Santos, voice.
