= Tudela (disambiguation) =

Tudela may refer to:

- Tudela, Navarre, a town and municipality in Navarre, Spain
  - Benjamin of Tudela Medieval Jewish traveller
  - William of Tudela, Medieval troubadour who wrote the first part of the Song of the Albigensian Crusade
  - Battle of Tudela (1808), part of the Peninsular War
- Tudela Veguín, a town in Asturias, Spain.
- Tudela, Cebu, a municipality in the Philippine province of Cebu
- Tudela, Misamis Occidental, a municipality in the Philippine province of Misamis Occidental
- João Maria Tudela (1929–2011), Portuguese singer and entertainer
- Josh Tudela (born 1984), professional soccer player for the Los Angeles Galaxy
