= Gilberto Grácio =

Portuguese guitar maker (1936–2021)

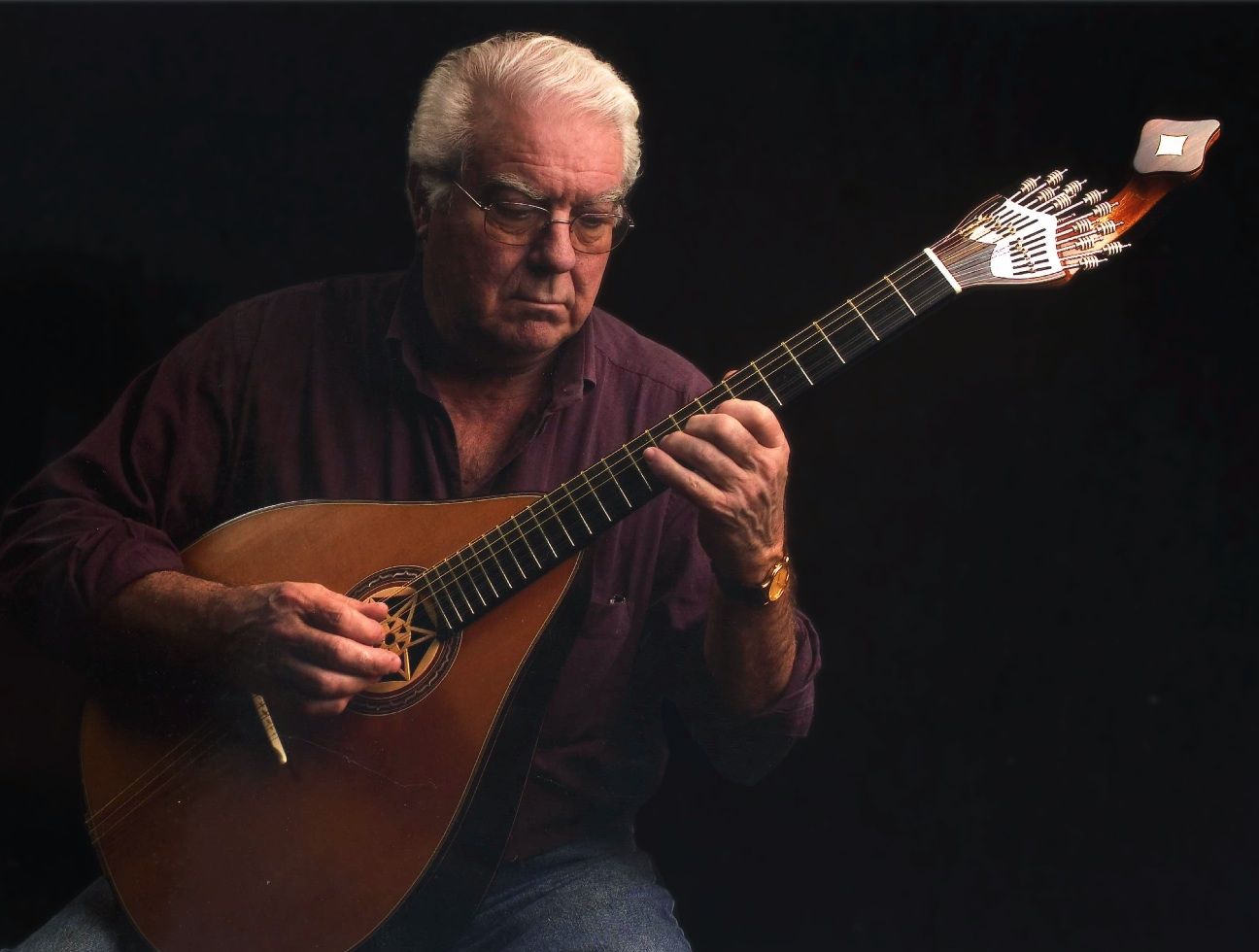
Gilberto Grácio and the guitolão

Gilberto Grácio (12 May 1936 – 1 November 2021) was a famous Portuguese guitar maker.

He was born in Lisbon, the son of João Pedro Grácio Junior and the grandson of João Pedro Grácio, both renowned luthiers. He started working in his father's workshop at the age of twelve.

The heir of a traditional art of Portuguese guitar making that has passed through generations of the Grácio family, he is the last of the Grácio luthiers, since his sons do not want to continue the tradition.

The Grácio family is considered to be one of the most important traditional guitar makers in Europe, and their contribution has helped develop the Portuguese guitar over the years. Their work together with that of the Paredes family reinvented the Lisbon guitar and created the Portuguese guitar of Coimbra.

Gilberto Grácio still worked in his workshop in Lisbon, and in the past years he has devoted most of his time to teaching his art. Two of his students kept making guitars according to his family's tradition, under his supervision.

Amongst the famous performers and musicians who have bought and played his instruments are Carlos Paredes, António Chainho, Fernando Alvim, and Jimmy Page.
