= Luís Goes =

Portuguese fado singer

Luiz Goes
- Born: 5 January 1933; Coimbra, Portugal
- Died: 18 September 2012 (aged 79); Mafra, Portugal
- Occupation: Coimbra fado singer

Luís Fernando de Sousa Pires de Goes commonly known as Luiz Goes (5 January 1933 – 18 September 2012) was a Portuguese Coimbra fado singer.
