= Armandinho (fado guitarist) =

Portuguese fado guitarist and composer

Armando Augusto Freire, known as Armandinho or Armando Freire (11 October 1891 - 21 December 1946) was a Portuguese fado guitarist and composer.

American travel writer Lawton Mackall in a 1931 book Portugal For Two was the first foreign writer to give an account of Armandinho's performances, but by this time Armandinho was already legendary in Portugal.

He was known for playing on the 12-string Portuguese guitar (Portuguese: guitarra portuguesa), and considered one of the heirs of the fado tradition of Petrolino (Luís Carlos da Silva, who recorded just once in 1904).

== Recordings ==
- Fados From Portugal, Vol. 1 including pt:Fado do Ciúme - composed by Frederico Valério made famous by Amália Rodrigues.
