= Maria José Valério =

Portuguese musical artist (1933–2021)

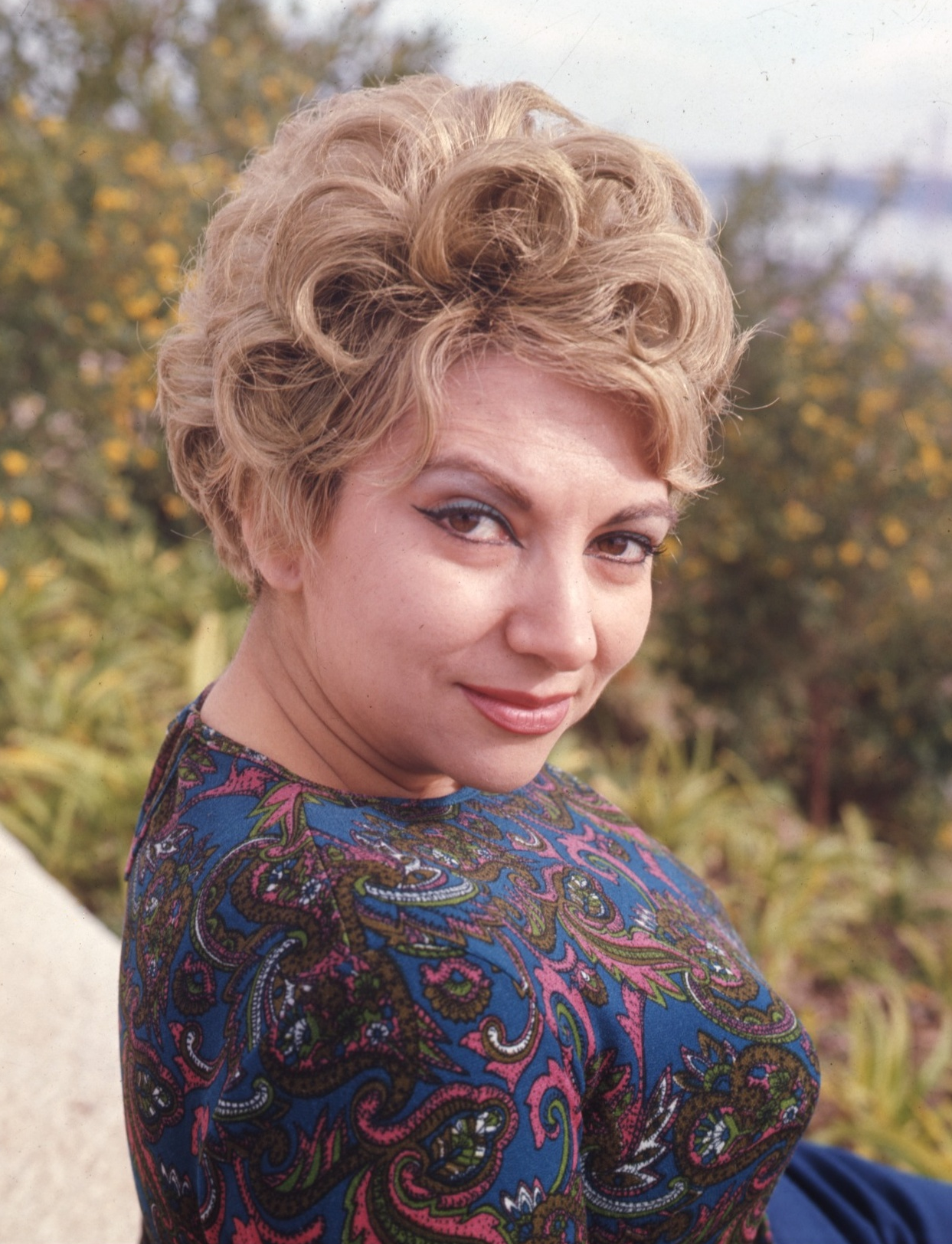
- Maria José Valério, 1968

Background information
- Born: Maria José Valério Dourado; 6 May 1933; Amadora, Portugal
- Died: 3 March 2021 (aged 87) Lisbon, Portugal
- Genres: Fado; Popular music
- Occupation: Singer
- Instrument: Vocals
- Years active: 1952–2021
- Labels: Movieplay, Valentim de Carvalho

Maria José Valério Dourado (6 May 1933 – 3 March 2021) was a Portuguese singer known for being a supporter of Sporting CP and the performer of "Marcha do Sporting", which was adopted as the club's anthem.

== Biography ==
Valério was born on 6 May 1933 in Amadora.

She started singing in 1950, at Liceu D. João de Castro, where she was a colleague of actress Lourdes Norberto. She attended the Radio Artists Preparation Center, at the then National Broadcaster, becoming part of the cast. She was the niece of conductor Frederico Valério, for whom she recorded many songs.

Valério gained prominence with the success of themes such as "O Polícia Sinaleiro" as well as the program Serões para Trabalhadores, alongside names such as Rui de Mascarenhas, Gina Maria or Paula Ribas. Her biggest hit is "Menina dos Telephones", written in 1962 by Manuel Paião and Eduardo Damas.

Valério was married to bullfighter José Trincheira, both of whom lived for about a year in Angola in the early 1960s. Between late 1972 and mid-1973, Valério resided in Brazil.

A regular presence on television, Valério became better known to new generations for being the interpreter of the "Marcha do Sporting", the anthem of Sporting Clube de Portugal (Sporting CP). The theme was reissued as a single when Sporting won the 1999–2000 Primeira Liga. On 1 April 2004, Valério was awarded the Gold Medal of Merit of the City of Lisbon, awarded by the Lisbon City Council and delivered at a ceremony at the Lisbon Forum. In 2008, a compilation album called O Melhor de Maria José Valério, was released with themes from her work recorded for the publisher Valentim de Carvalho. In 2017, she headlined the play Da Revista ao Musical alongside António Calvário.

== Death ==
Valério died of COVID-19 at Hospital de Santa Maria, Lisbon on 3 March 2021, aged 87.
