= Portuguese guitar =

Plucked string instrument with twelve steel strings

Portuguese Guitar Guitarra Portuguesa
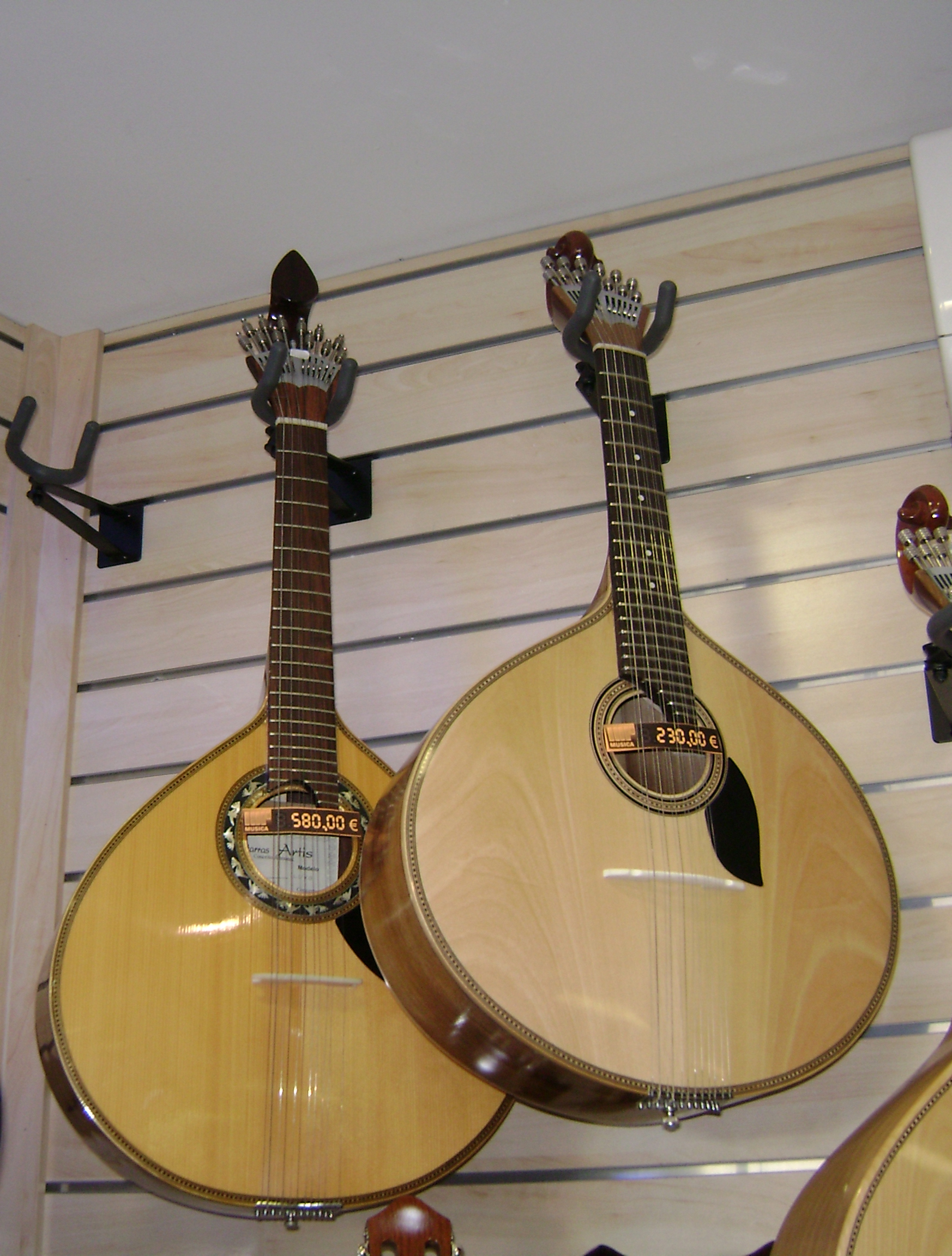
- Left: Coimbra guitar; right: Lisboa guitar

String instrument
- Classification: String instrument

Related instruments
- English guitar - Cittern

The Portuguese guitar (Portuguese: guitarra portuguesa, pronounced [ɡiˈtaʁɐ puɾtuˈɣezɐ]) is a plucked string instrument with twelve steel strings, strung in six courses of two strings. It is one of the few musical instruments that still uses watch-key or Preston tuners. It is iconically associated with the fado musical genre.

== History ==
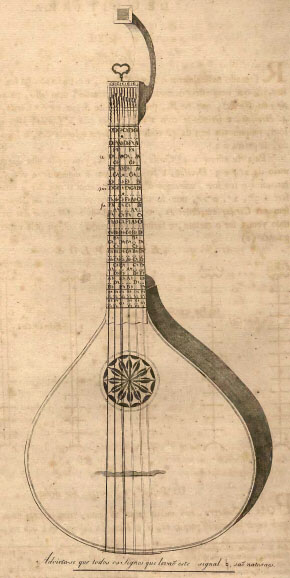
Portuguese guitar

The Portuguese guitar most diffused today has undergone considerable technical modification in the last century (dimensions, mechanical tuning system, etc.) although it has kept the same number of courses, the string tuning, and the finger technique characteristic of this type of instrument.

The Portuguese Guitar is a descendant of the Medieval citole, based on evidence of its use in Portugal since the thirteenth century (then known as 'cítole' in Portuguese) amongst troubadour and minstrel circles and in the Renaissance period, although initially it was restricted to noblemen in court circles. Later it became popular and references have been found to citterns being played in the theater, in taverns and barbershops in the seventeenth and eighteenth centuries in particular.

In 1582, Friar Phillipe de Caverell visited Lisbon and described its customs; he mentions the Portuguese people’s love for the cittern and other musical instruments. In 1649 was published the catalogue of the Royal Music Library of King John IV of Portugal containing the best-known books of cittern music from foreign composers of the sixteenth and seventeenth centuries, in which the complexity and technical difficulty of the pieces allow us to believe that there had been highly skilled players in Portugal.

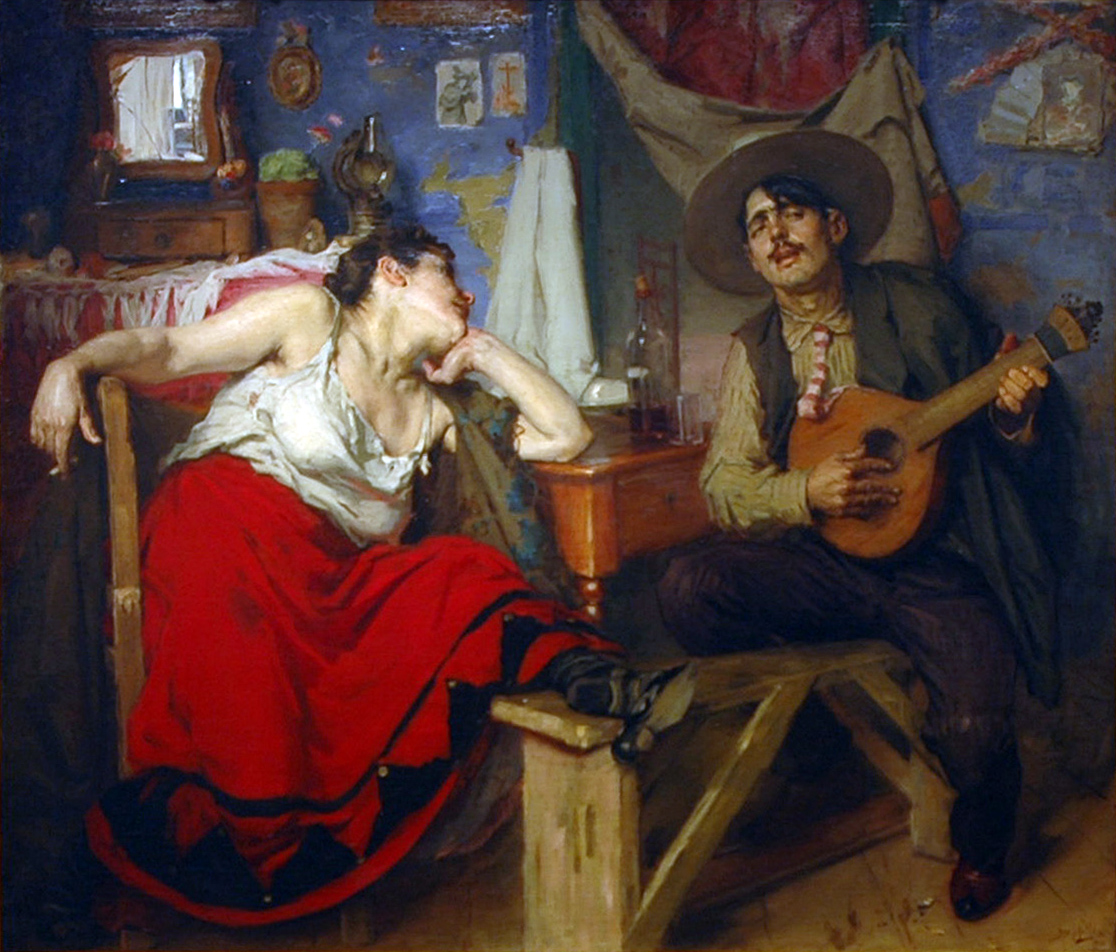
Fado, by José Malhoa (1910)

The angel playing the cittern (c.1680), a sculpture of large dimensions in the Alcobaça Monastery, depicts in detail the direct ancestor of the Portuguese guitar. In the first half of the eighteenth century, Ribeiro Sanches (1699–1783) had cittern lessons in the town of Guarda, Portugal, as he mentions in a letter from St. Petersburg in 1735.

In the same period, there is other evidence to the use of the cittern alluding to a repertoire of sonatas, minuets, etc. shared with other instruments such as the harpsichord or the guitar. Later in the century (c. 1750) a new type of cittern, the so-called English guitar made its appearance in Portugal. By 1786 those made by Simpson, an English luthier, became highly popular, and it was noted that he could also provide reliable nickel-silver strings. There was a type of cittern locally modified by German, English, Scottish and Dutch makers and enthusiastically greeted by the new mercantile bourgeoisie of the city of Porto who used it in the domestic context of Hausmusik practice. This consisted of the "languid Modinhas", the "lingering Minuets" and the "risqué Lunduns", as they were then called. The English guitar disappeared as a separate instrument by the mid 19th century in Portugal as elsewhere, but its influence on the subsequent Portuguese guitar can be seen in terms of the watch-key tuning system, size, stringing with 6 strings and tuning - see description of the afinação natural (natural tuning) under Tuning below. Especially from the middle of the 19th century, the Portuguese guitar as a separate instrument developed from the various earlier types of citterns came into fashion by its association with the Lisbon song (fado) accompaniment.

The last detailed reference to the cítara appeared in 1858 in J.F. Fètis' book The Music Made Easy. The Portuguese translation includes a glossary describing the various characteristics (tunings, social status, repertoire, etc.) of both cittern and "English" guitar of the time.

Gradually the Simpson design was transformed by Portuguese luthiers, with a wider body, longer scale length, and a wider fingerboard, made more manageable by using a large radius, rather than a flat fingerboard.

The Portuguese guitar is used for solo music (guitarradas) as well as the accompaniment, which it shares with a steel strung classical guitar (viola de fado) and occasional double bass or guitar-bass, and its wide repertoire is often presented in concert halls and in the context of classical and world music festivals all around the world.

== Models ==
There are two distinct Portuguese guitar models: the Lisboa and the Coimbra.

The differences between the two models are the scale length (445 mm of free string length in Lisboa guitars and 470 mm in Coimbra guitars), body measurements, and other finer construction details. Overall, the Coimbra model is of simpler construction than the Lisboa model. Visually and most distinctively, the Lisboa model can easily be differentiated from the Coimbra model by its broader soundboard and the scroll ornament (caracol—snail) that usually adorns the tuning machine, in place of Coimbra's teardrop-shaped (lágrima) motif. Lisboa guitars usually employ a shorter and narrower neck profile as well. Acoustically, the models both have a very distinct timbre and are tuned a major second apart, the Lisboa model in D, having a brighter and more resonant sound, and the Coimbra model in C with a darker timbre. The choice between the both of them falls upon each player's preferences.

As early as 1905 luthiers were building larger Portuguese guitars (called guitarrão, the plural being guitarrões), seemingly in very small numbers and with limited success. Recently, the famed luthier Gilberto Grácio has built a guitarrão, which he named a guitolão instead; this instrument which allows for a wider timbral range, on the low and the high end, than a regular Portuguese guitar.

== Technique ==
The techniques employed to play the Portuguese guitar are what are historically called figueta and dedilho. Figueta technique comprises playing solely with the thumb and the index fingers and it was inspired by the technique used to play Viola da Terra. Dedilho technique concentrates on up and down strokes of the index finger to play complex passages. On the Portuguese guitar the strings are picked with the corner of the fingernails, avoiding contact of the flesh with the strings. The unused fingers of the picking hand rest below the strings, on the guarda-unhas on the soundboard. Most players use various materials in place of natural fingernails; these fingerpicks (unhas) were traditionally made of tortoiseshell, but today are usually nylon or plastic. While Lisboa unhas are commonly rectangular shaped for a clearer attack, Coimbra unhas tend to follow the natural curve of the fingernail.

Technique basics are the fado maior, fado menor and fado Mouraria. Then one masters the trinado (a triplet ornament), slides, picking individual strings (instead of both in a course), and intense characteristic vibrato to embellish the melody. Finally, in addition to the fados, there are traditional virtuosic pieces—the fado Lopes, and Variações em Ré Menor, Lá Menor, Mi Menor and Si Menor.

A good guitarrista should know at least a hundred of the over two hundred standard fados in any key requested by the fadista.

=== Lisboa ===
The Lisboa style of playing traditionally utilizes the Guitarra de Lisboa, but today it is increasingly common to see musicians with Guitarra de Coimbra tuned tighter to accommodate the Lisboa tuning. In accompanying Lisbon Fado the guitarrista plays the introduction, traditionally based on the second half of the vocal melody, then alternates between the techniques described above and short expressive phrases answering the fadista's phrases in a musical call-and-response. In faster fados the guitarra often improvises virtuosically throughout, including soloing over the fadista's singing.

=== Coimbra ===
The Coimbra style of playing, popularized by Artur and Carlos Paredes, originates with the university students from the historic Universidade de Coimbra. The male students and graduates would traditionally play a Coimbra fado at night or serenata (serenade) for a woman to be courted.

Instead of bridging the gap between a singer's phrases, in Coimbra Fado, the guitarra plays the chordal accompaniment alongside the Acoustic guitar. As opposed to the rapid, more technically challenging Lisbon Fado, the guitarrista plays a downstroke with the thumb followed by a rolled chord across all the strings which ends with the index finger crossed in front of the thumb. This pattern is easily modified to fit the time signature of the specific Coimbra Fado being played.

== Notable artists ==
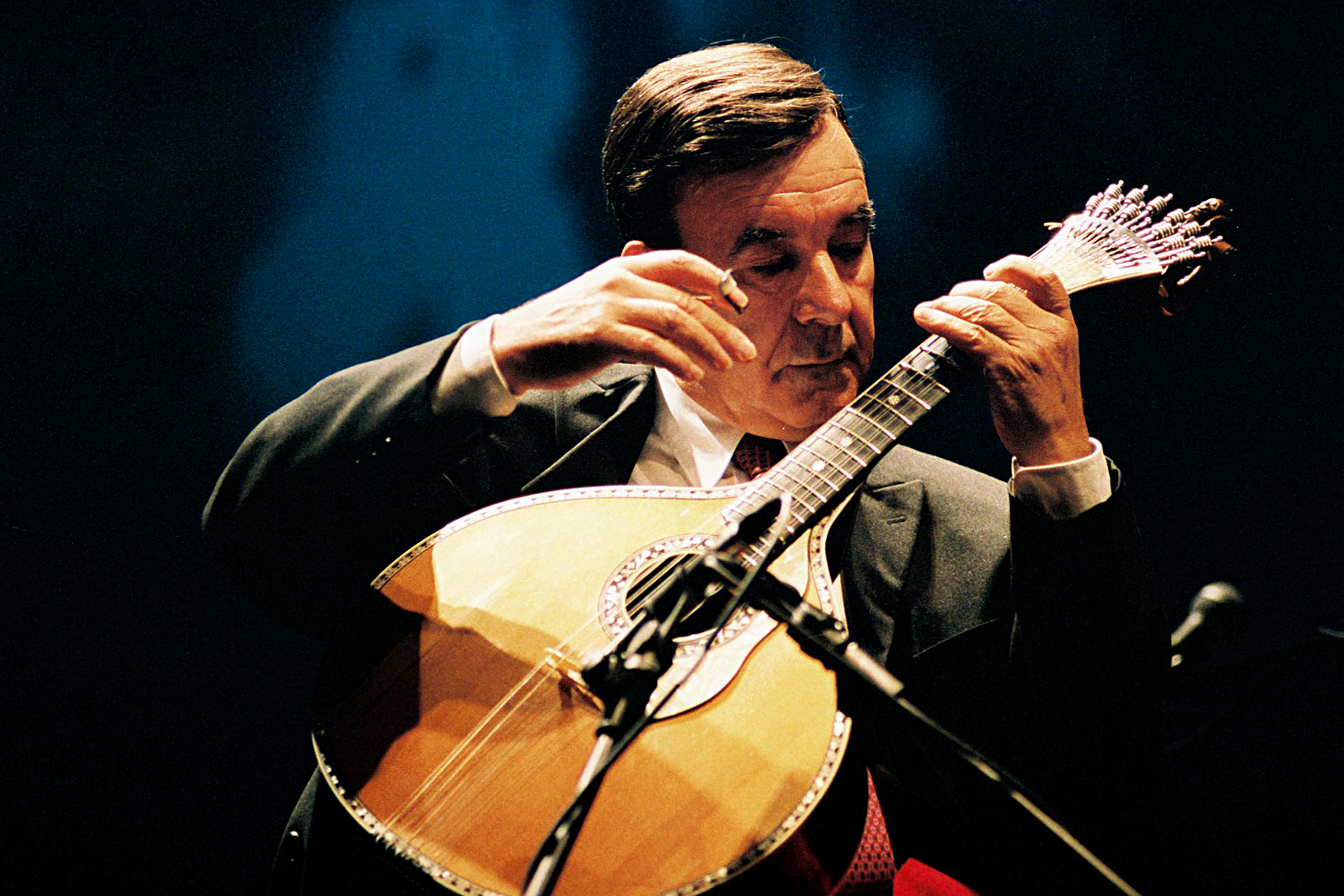
António Chainho and his Portuguese guitar (Lisbon model)

Armandinho, born in 1891, became one of the most influential guitar players in Lisbon, leaving a vast repertoire of variations and fados behind. He is credited with popularizing the second soloist approach to guitarra playing in fado accompaniment over the usage of simple plucked chords. Following in Armandinho's footsteps came other guitarists, such as Jaime Santos, Raul Nery, José Nunes, Carlos Gonçalves and Fontes Rocha. Artur Paredes, born in 1899, was an equally important player in the city of Coimbra. Many of today's Coimbra guitar features can be traced back to his contact with local luthiers. His son Carlos Paredes was a virtuoso and attained great popularity, becoming the most internationally known Portuguese guitar player. His compositions on the Portuguese guitar go beyond the traditional use of the instrument in fado musicianship giving him (and the instrument) a status above folk or regional music. This soloistic tradition has been followed till today by several outstanding musicians such as Pedro Caldeira Cabral, Antonio Chainho, Ricardo Rocha, Paulo Soares, and several other virtuoso guitarists of the younger generation. The first concerto for Portuguese guitar and orchestra was composed by Fernando Lapa and premiered by Paulo Soares in 2003 at the Gil Vicente theatre in Coimbra with the Coimbra Orchestra. Pedro Henriques da Silva also composed his concerto for Portuguese guitar and orchestra, and premiered it on December 5, 2017 with the Orchestra of the Swan at Stratford ArtsHouse in Stratford-upon-Avon.

Many guitarristas in Lisboa—Mario Pacheco, Luis Guerreiro, Jose Manuel Neto, Henrique Leitão, Bruno Chaveiro, Paulo de Castro, Ricardo Martins and Custodio Castelo—now use Oscar Cardoso guitarras, which feature the innovation of a cutaway in the back of the guitarra, and a Coimbra string length but with Lisboa tuning. The virtuosity of these artists has changed the sound of fado radically, and their speed is extraordinary. Rocha has composed highly avant-garde pieces, and the original guitarradas of Pacheco, Castelo and Martins have become common repertoire in Lisboa, as those of Soares have become in Coimbra. Most advanced players will learn some of Carlos Paredes' difficult works. Marta Pereira da Costa has achieved prominence as the first female virtuoso guitarrista.

=== Outside Portuguese music ===
The Portuguese guitar played a small role in Celtic and western folk music following the folk revival. In the 1970s, Andy Irvine of the band Planxty played a modified Portuguese guitar. British luthier Stefan Sobell based his early 1970s creation of the modern cittern on a Portuguese guitar he'd bought at a used shop in Leeds some years previously.

Several jazz musicians have also recorded with the Portuguese guitar, including Brad Shepik.

The Portuguese guitar features prominently on Sun Kil Moon's debut album Ghosts Of The Great Highway.

British guitarist Steve Howe of the band Yes plays a Portuguese guitar on the songs "I've Seen All Good People" from The Yes Album (1971), "Wonderous Stories" from Going for the One (1977), "Nine Voices (Longwalker)" from The Ladder (1999), "Hour of Need" from Fly from Here (2011), "To Ascend" from Heaven and Earth (2014), and "Sister Sleeping Soul" from The Quest (2021).

British musician Chris Hirst plays fado on the Portuguese guitar, and also uses it for contemporary music with his group Quatrapuntal. This takes influences from fado and the Portuguese group Madredeus, but mixes it with classical music and other elements.

Israeli guitarist Ziv Tamari plays a Portuguese guitar on his album "My Promised Land".

== Portuguese guitar makers ==
The art of handcrafted construction of the Portuguese guitar has deeply traditional and familial roots.

In the history of the construction of the Portuguese guitar, entirely handcrafted, two families of guitar makers stand out who perfected and passed down their art across successive generations:

1. The first begins with Álvaro da Silveira and is continued by Manuel Cardoso, his son Óscar Cardoso, and his grandson João Cardoso. The Óscar Cardoso workshop, now in its third generation, keeps the tradition alive in Ericeira, and thus represents the current continuity of this luthier art, connecting traditional methods to contemporary practice.
2. The second begins with João Pedro Grácio and continues with João Pedro Grácio Júnior, who distinguished himself among six brothers, and his son Gilberto Grácio (1936–2021), the last direct representative of this family. The ongoing dialogue between this workshop and the performers who favoured it — such as Armando Freire, Artur Paredes, Carlos Paredes, and José Nunes — was fundamental to the technical and acoustic evolution of the instrument.

The Fado Museum maintains a Portuguese Guitar Construction Workshop that pays tribute to the two traditional schools in the art of Portuguese guitar making, those of Gilberto Grácio and Óscar Cardoso, and promotes the safeguarding of this craft, which is integrated into the Fado Safeguarding Plan as Intangible Cultural Heritage.

== Tuning ==
Afinação de Lisboa (Lisboa tuning)

Afinação de Coimbra (Coimbra tuning)

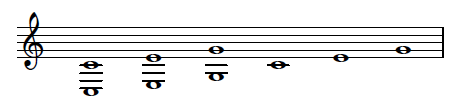
Afinação natural (Natural tuning)

The tuning chiefly employed on the Portuguese guitar was historically called afinação do fado or afinação do fado corrido. It was probably developed in the early 19th century, as it was already largely adopted by Lisbon's fadistas by the mid-century. With the diminishing use of the natural tuning (see below) by players, this tuning came to simply be called either afinação de Lisboa, when tuned high, in D, or afinação de Coimbra, when tuned low, in C; this stems from the fact that, while most Lisbon Fado players tuned their guitars in D, in Coimbra the students came to tune theirs in C as standard practice, mainly through the influence of Artur Paredes. Regardless of the difference in pitch between the two variations of the tuning, in practice, the latter still makes use of the former's aural conventions, as such a do/C is called re/D, a D is called mi/E, etc., by the players (essentially making a Coimbra-tuned Portuguese guitar a transposing instrument similar to a B-flat trumpet in that a given note is referred to by the note name a whole step higher than the note name that concert-pitch conventions would use).

The natural tuning, inherited from the English guitar of the 18th century, was also very frequently employed up to the first half of the 20th century, being preferred to the former by some late-19th-century players; it was frequently tuned in E instead of C, as this simplified the change between the fado tuning for players who used both. Some variations of this tuning were also adopted, such as the afinação natural com 4ª, also known as afinação da Mouraria, or the afinação de João de Deus, also known as afinação natural menor. The natural tuning and its variations have been for the most part, out of practice for several decades.

There is also a Portuguese baritone guitar called Guitolão which is tuned a fourth below the Coimbra guitar and a fifth below the Lisboa guitar, to a low G tuning called afinação de Guitolão (G, D, E, A, D, E).

== Notation ==
The Portuguese guitar can use Portuguese guitar tablature, sheet music in treble, or a combination of both. The dedilho technique is notated with up and down arrows over multiple notes corresponding to a downstroke or upstroke of the index finger. An "i" is used to indicate a stroke with the index finger, or indicador, and a "p" is used for the thumb, or polegar. The middle finger is rarely used but notated with an "m" for médio.

While one can find many virtuosic Coimbra pieces written out as sheet music, fados are generally improvised and require no music for a good guitarrista to play. The chord progression to each specific fado should be innately understood by the studied guitarrista which allows for ease of improvisation in responding to the fadista. While this skill has traditionally been acquired by younger players playing alongside a more advanced guitarrista in an ensemble, it was only in the early 2000s that the first fado school had been established to formally teach the improvisational style alongside the written version.

== See also ==
- Bandolim
- Viola braguesa
- Rabeca
- Gaita transmontana
- Cavaquinho
