= Barreiro e Lavradio =

- Civil parish
- Location in Portugal
- Coordinates: 38.665°N 9.069°W
- Country: Portugal
- Region: Lisbon
- Metropolitan area: Lisbon
- District: Setúbal
- Municipality: Barreiro

Area
  - Total: 7.74 km^{2} (2.99 sq mi)

Population (2011)
  - Total: 21,877
  - Density: 2,800/km^{2} (7,300/sq mi)
- Time zone: UTC+00:00 (WET)
  - Summer (DST): UTC+01:00 (WEST)

Barreiro e Lavradio is a civil parish in the municipality of Barreiro, Portugal. It was formed in 2013 by the merger of the former parishes Barreiro and Lavradio. The population in 2011 was 21,877, in an area of 7.74 km^{2}.
