= Carlos Paredes =

Portuguese guitarist and composer (1925–2004)

Carlos Paredes ComSE
- Paredes in the studio, photographed by Augusto Cabrita

Background information
- Born: 16 February 1925, Coimbra, Portugal
- Died: 23 July 2004 (aged 79) Lisbon, Portugal
- Genres: Fado, Coimbra fado, classical
- Instrument: Portuguese guitar
- Years active: 1939–1993
- Labels: Valentim de Carvalho; Columbia; Decca; Philips Records

Carlos Paredes ComSE (Portuguese pronunciation: [ˈkaɾluʃ pɐˈɾeðɨʃ]; 16 February 1925 – 23 July 2004) was a virtuoso Portuguese guitar player and composer. He is regarded as one of the greatest players of Portuguese guitar of all-time.

Born in Coimbra, Portugal, in a family with a long tradition of guitar playing, he was taught to play the Portuguese guitar by his father, Artur Paredes. He composed numerous soundtracks for cinema and theatre, such as the soundtrack for the Portuguese film Os Verdes Anos (1963), which contains his famous piece "Canção Verde Anos". He released several recordings as a solo artist and performed in numerous countries worldwide.

Besides his music career, Paredes also worked in the public service for most of his life. In 1958, during Portugal's dictatorial Estado Novo regime, he was imprisoned for 18 months for joining the Portuguese Communist Party, at the time an illegal organization.

== Biography ==
=== Early life ===
Carlos Paredes was born in Coimbra on 16 February 1925. His father was Artur Paredes, an acclaimed player of Portuguese guitar from Coimbra. His grandfather, Gonçalo Paredes, his great-uncle Manuel Paredes and his great-grandfather António Paredes were also guitar players.

Around 1934, aged 9, Paredes and his family moved to Lisbon. He did his primary education at the João de Deus School, and afterwards attended the Passos Manuel Lyceum. While attending the lyceum, he had violin and piano lessons. In 1943, he entered the Chemical-Industrial Engineering Course in Instituto Superior Técnico, but was enrolled for only one year.

He started playing guitar when he was 4 years old, taught by his father. At age 9, he began accompanying his father on the guitar in his father's concerts. At age 14, Carlos and Artur Paredes started participating in a weekly show on the Emissora Nacional de Radiodifusão, Portugal's public national radio broadcaster, a show that was created by Artur Paredes himself.

In 1949, he became a public service worker, a job he would retire from only later in life, in November 1986. He worked in the radiography archive of the Hospital de São José, in Lisbon, while maintaining his musical career.

=== Political affiliation and imprisonment ===
Paredes grew up in an environment of discreet resistance and political opposition to António Salazar's Estado Novo regime. In 1958, he became a member of the Portuguese Communist Party, which at the time was an illegal organization in Portugal.

In the morning of 26 September 1958, he was arrested by PIDE agents in his workplace in Hospital de São José, on the accusation of belonging to an illegal political party opposing the government. He was kept imprisoned for 18 months. During his time in prison, he composed music in his head. According to some sources, people in the prison thought that Paredes was going insane, walking around his cell pretending to play the guitar, when in fact he was composing.

After his release from prison, he was suspended from his job in the hospital and worked for some years as a delegate of medical propaganda.

After the Carnation Revolution in Portugal, like others who had been political prisoners during the Estado Novo regime, Paredes was seen as a hero. He disliked this status and preferred not to talk about his time in prison, saying that there were people who suffered more than him. He was reinstated to his previous job in the Hospital de São José shortly after the revolution.

Paredes remained a member of the Portuguese Communist Party until his death.

=== Music career ===
==== 1950s and 1960s ====
Paredes' first release was a self-titled EP in 1957. He was accompanied by Fernando Alvim on the classical guitar. After this first record, the musical partnership between Paredes and Alvim would last for more than 20 years.

During the 1960s, Paredes composed the soundtracks for numerous Portuguese films. He composed the soundtrack for the 1963 film Os Verdes Anos, directed by Paulo Rocha. The piece "Canção Verdes Anos", which is part of this soundtrack and was also included in his first studio album, became one of his most recognizable works. He also composed the soundtracks for the film Fado Corrido (1964), by Jorge Brum do Canto, the film Mudar de Vida (1966), by Paulo Rocha, and contributed to the soundtrack of several short-films: Rendas de Metais Preciosos (1960), by Cândido Costa Pinto; P.X.O. (1962), by Pierre Kast and Jacques Valcroze; As Pinturas do Meu Irmão Júlio (1965), by Manoel de Oliveira; Crónica do Esforço Perdido (1966), by António de Macedo; À Cidade (The City) (1968) and The Colombus Route (1969), by José Fonseca e Costa; and Tráfego e Estiva (1968), by Manuel Guimarães.

In the theatre, he collaborated with José Cardoso Pires and Fernando Gusmão in 1964, with Carlos Avillez in the play Bodas de Sangue and performances of García Lorca's The House of Bernarda Alba by the Teatro Experimental de Cascais.

His first studio album, Guitarra Portuguesa, was released in 1967. That same year, he played alongside Amália Rodrigues in her show at the Olympia in Paris, by her invitation. Amália, who was very impressed with his talent, wished to have Paredes accompany her in her touring band, but Paredes declined, citing his father's advice: "If you want to be soloist, you must accompany no-one". Still, the two remained lifelong friends.

In 1968 he released three EPs: Porto Santo, Divertimento and Variações em Ré menor.

==== 1970s ====
In 1970 he released a collaboration album with Cecília de Melo, titled Meu País. In 1971, he released his second solo album, Movimento Perpétuo.

Between 1971 and 1977, he composed the music for Agustin Cuzzani's play O Avançado Centro Morreu ao Amanhecer, performed by the Campolide Theatre Group. He also selected the soundtrack for the group following shows.

After the Carnation Revolution of 1974 in Portugal, he toured Europe. He participated in several events promoted by the Portuguese Communist Party, playing shows in Portugal and Eastern Europe. His music was used in the television coverage of the country's first democratic elections for the Assembly of the Republic, in 1975. In 1975 he released the album É Preciso um País with poet Manuel Alegre.

Around 1975, Paredes was working on the successor to Movimento Perpétuo. The recording sessions were interrupted and resumed several times because of Paredes' dissatisfaction with his recordings. Eventually, the initial plans for the album were abandoned, but some of the recordings from these sessions were selected by Paredes for a release named O Oiro e o Trigo. However, his record label Valentim de Carvalho did not agree with it, and this was the basis for his breakup with Valentim de Carvalho. O Oiro e o Trigo was ultimately released in East Germany in 1980.

==== 1980s ====
In 1982, his piece "Danças Para Uma Guitarra" was choreographed by Vasco Wellenkamp for the Gulbenkian Ballet.

In 1983 Paredes released the live album Concerto em Frankfurt, recorded in a concert at the Frankfurt Opera.

In 1986 he released a collaboration album with Portuguese composer António Victorino de Almeida, titled Invenções Livres.

In 1987 he released a new solo album, Espelho de Sons, which reached 3rd place in the Portuguese weekly album charts. It was followed by Asas Sobre o Mundo, in 1989.

==== 1990s ====
In 1990 Paredes released an album with American jazz bassist Charlie Haden, titled Dialogues.

His last show was in October 1993 at the Aula Magna, in Lisbon, accompanied by Luísa Amaro.

After retiring from music and public life, he release two more albums from previously unreleased material: Na Corrente (1996), containing pieces recorded between 1969 and 1973 at the Valentim de Carvalho studios, and Canção para Titi (2000), with recordings from 1993.

=== Illness and death ===
When I die, the guitar dies also. My father used to say that, when he died, he would like his guitar to be broken and buried with him. If I have to die, my guitar will also die with me.

— Carlos Paredes

In December 1993, Paredes was diagnosed with myelopathy. The disease forced Paredes to stop playing guitar, thus ending his career as a musician. He was interned at the Fundação-Lar Nossa Senhora da Saúde, in Campo de Ourique, Lisbon, until his death.

Paredes died on 23 July 2004, in Lisbon. Following his death, the Portuguese government declared one day of national mourning in his honour. He lays buried at the Prazeres Cemetery, in Lisbon.

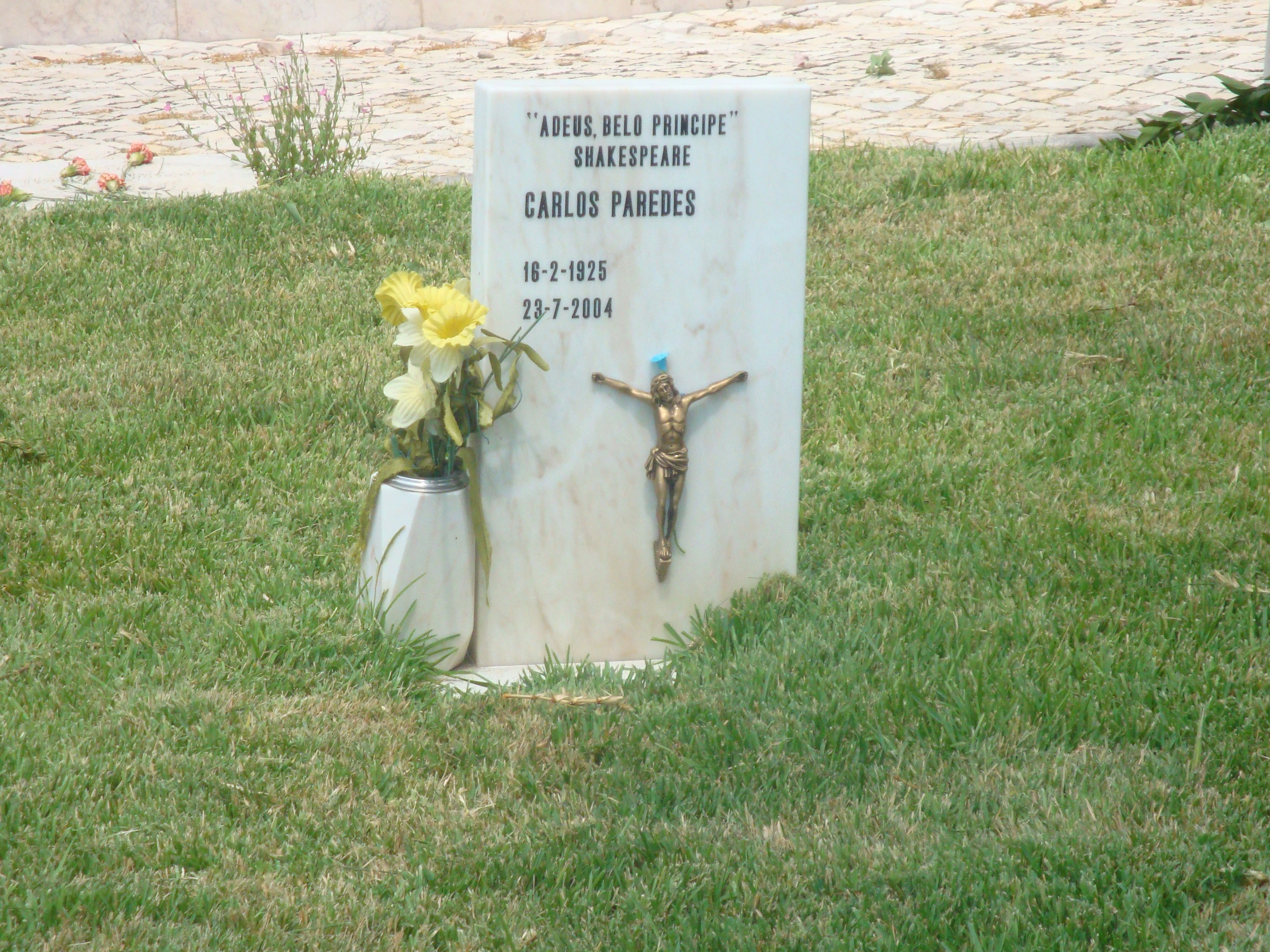
Paredes' grave at the Prazeres Cemetery, in Lisbon

== Personal life ==
Carlos Paredes was married two times. He married Ana Maria Napoleão Franco in 1960. His second marriage was to Cecília de Melo. He had six children.

He is remembered for his humility by those who knew him. He refused to solely make a living as a musician and kept his job in the radiography archive of the Hospital de São José until the age of 61, stating that he "loved music too much to live from it".

== Legacy ==
Carlos Paredes is regarded as one of the greatest Portuguese guitarists of all-time and a genius of the Portuguese guitar. He is frequently called "The master of the Portuguese guitar" (Portuguese: O mestre da guitarra portuguesa) and "The man with the thousand fingers" (Portuguese: O homem dos mil dedos). Acclaimed fado singer Amália Rodrigues said that Paredes was "a national monument, like the Jerónimos Monastery".

Several buildings in Portugal are named after Paredes. The Carlos Paredes Prize, an award for Portuguese musicians given by the Vila Franca de Xira municipality since 2003, is named after him.

== Awards and honours ==
In 1992, Carlos Paredes was awarded the title of Commander of the Military Order of Saint James of the Sword by the President of Portugal.

== Discography ==
=== Studio albums ===
- Guitarra Portuguesa (1967)
- Movimento Perpétuo (1971)
- O Oiro e o Trigo (1980, East Germany release)
- Espelho de Sons (1987)
- Asas Sobre o Mundo (1989)
- Na Corrente (1996)
- Canção para Titi: Os Inéditos 1993 (2000)

=== Extended plays ===
- Carlos Paredes (1957)
- Guitarradas Sob o Tema do Filme "Verdes Anos" (1963)
- Romance Nº 2 (1968)
- Fantasia (1968)
- Porto Santo (1968)
- António Marinheiro - Tema da Peça (1972)

=== Collaboration albums ===
- Meu País (1970), with Cecília Melo
- É Preciso um País (1975), with Manuel Alegre
- Invenções Livres (1986), with António Vitorino d'Almeida
- Dialogues (1990), with Charlie Haden

=== Live albums ===
- Concerto em Frankfurt (1983)

=== Compilation albums ===
- Meister Der Portugiesischen Gitarre (1977, East Germany release)

== See also ==
- Coimbra fado
- Portuguese guitar
