= João Maria Tudela =

Portuguese singer, musician, and entertainer

João Maria Tudela (August 27, 1929, in Lourenço Marques, Mozambique – April 22, 2011, in Cascais), was a Portuguese singer, musician and entertainer.

== History ==
João Maria Tudela was born in Lourenço Marques, the capital of the Portuguese African territory of Mozambique in 1929. His father's family was wealthy with noble ancestors; Tudela's grandmother gave his father a part of her patrimony when he married Tudela'a mother. While in Mozambique with his young parents, his father fled the territory to the United Kingdom on a cruise ship, after he fell in love with a British woman (Tudela would only see his father again as a 16-year-old student in Coimbra; his mother would marry another man that Tudela would always call his "father"). Tudela described his biological father as a "prince" whose premature marriage at 18 years had turned him into an emotionally unstable person.

He spent his early youth studying in South Africa and in his home-town of Lourenço Marques where he started to play as a soloist at the Liceu Salazar (Salazar High School). He played the piano, guitar, and viola without even knowing music. He went to Coimbra, first as a secondary school (high school) student and then as a student of the Coimbra University Law School. In Coimbra, he joined the academic music groups and, though his studies did not progress and he did not graduate, his artistic talent was developed. Due to his scarce interest and lack of results at the university, his family imposed his return to Mozambique after four years with little academic progress.

Tudela worked first for the insurance company Companhia de Seguros Império and then in Shell, where he remained for a decade as a sales manager. By this time he had developed a talent as a tennis player, becoming one of the best athletes of Mozambique in that sport. But João Maria Tudela's passion for music was huge and he never stopped singing, especially the Coimbra fado, and his fame became large in the whole of Mozambique. He also became interested in African music and rhythm. In subsequent years, he continued to write and act in Mozambique, starting a partnership with the orchestra of Dan Hill. In 1959 João Maria Tudela created his first and most successful song ever, Kanimambo, which made a big career in mainland Portugal, the United States and in South America. Always defending his status as amateur, he was invited to a tour in Brazil. Upon his return from this tour, he performed throughout Portugal with great success, and a few months later he returned to stay definitely as a professional. In the early sixties, João Maria Tudela entered the Portuguese art scene by the big door. His elegant style had earned him a legion of fans, and a career crowned with numerous awards, including the Critics Prize for Best TV in 1962. In 1968 he sang Ao Vento e às Andorinhas in the Festival RTP da Canção. During the same year, after being barred from returning to RTP following the interpretation of Cama 4, Sala 5, written by José Carlos Ary dos Santos and Nuno Nazareth Fernandes, Tudela resolved to end his career. The last years of his artistic career are marked by an increasing demand on the themes (lyrics and compositions), and a more critical approach to the policies of the Estado Novo regime. After the Carnation Revolution (1974), Tudela only acted as an entertainer in a few RTP TV shows and theatre and casino performances.
