= Artur Paredes =

Portuguese guitarist

Artur Paredes (10 May 1899 – 20 December 1980) was a Portuguese guitar player born in the city of Coimbra, Portugal. He was the biological son of Gonçalo Rodrigues Paredes and Maria do Céu.

On 18 April 1915, when Paredes was 15 years old, his father attempted to kill his mother and shot her 3 times before committing suicide by shooting himself in the head.

Paredes studied at a private school, and despite not registering as a student, was considered an “academic relative” by some students. He was a member of the Coimbra Academic Band and Choral Society, with whom he travelled to some European countries such as Spain, France and Portugal during his career.

At the age of 26, Paredes played as a soloist after travelling to Brazil in 1925. He accompanied singers such as António Menano, Paradela de Oliveira, Lucas Junot and Edmundo Bettencourt.

At the age of 28, Paredes recorded four records, with eight songs including;

- "Bailados do Minho"
- "Variações em Ré Menor"
- "Fantasia"
- an instrumental version of "Fado Hilário"
- "Variações em Ré Maior"
- "Canção do Ribeirinho"
- "Variações em Lá Menor"
- "Passatempo"

Later, Paredes became a barber, and then a staff member of the Banco Nacional Ultramarino. He remained connected to Coimbra University. He was promoted through the bank in 1935, and moved to the city of Lisbon, where he lived for the rest of his life.
