= Cancionero de Palacio =

Spanish manuscript of Renaissance music

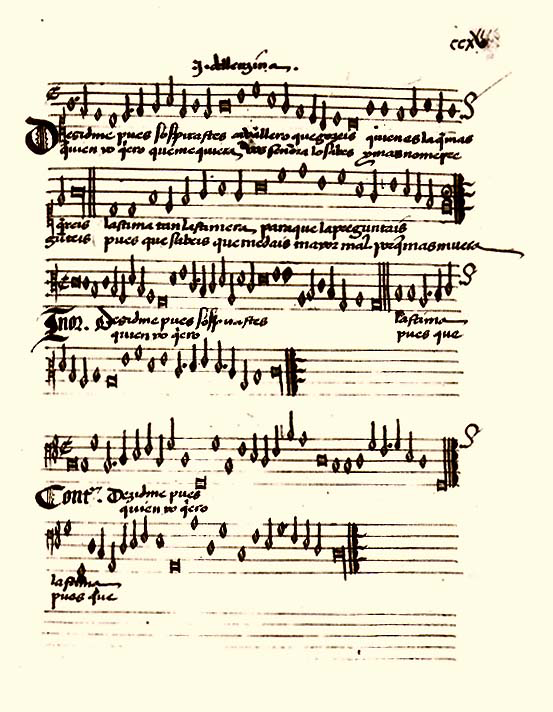
Folio from the Cancionero de Palacio containing the song Desidme, pues sospirastes, by Juan del Encina

The Cancionero de Palacio (Madrid, Biblioteca Real, MS II–1335), or Cancionero Musical de Palacio (CMP), also known as Cancionero de Barbieri, is a Spanish manuscript of Renaissance music. The works in it were compiled during a time span of around 40 years, from the mid-1470s until the beginning of the 16th century, approximately coinciding with the reign of the Catholic Monarchs.

== The manuscript ==
The first ten folios are not numbered; the remaining folios are numbered from 1 to 304. Based on the index of works included in the beginning of the manuscript, it originally had 548 works. Many folios have been lost, reducing the number of works currently in the manuscript to 458.

The manuscript was written by 9 different people and, in all, received 11 successive additions:

- The first addition happened in the first years of the 16th century, most probably after 1505, as a result of the reorganization of the Court's musical chapel ordered by Ferdinand II of Aragon, one year after the death of Queen Isabella. This is the most numerous addition and its works are the most representative of the circumspect and expressive style characteristic of the reign of the Catholic Monarchs.
- The next four additions were supposedly made between 1505 and 1510.
- The next two were made around 1515.
- The 8th addition was possibly made in 1516, right after the death of Ferdinand II.
- The 9th happened between 1516 and 1517.
- The 10th addition, from folios 293 to 304, consisted of a tiny cancionero written in a different kind of paper which was incorporated to the body of the main manuscript. The works contained in it are not listed in the original opening index, and two of its works were already present in the Cancionero. It possibly originated in the chapel of Joanna of Castile, in Tordesillas.
- The last addition was made between 1519 and 1520, when the chapel of the Catholic Monarchs had already moved to other location.

By the end of the 19th century the manuscript was found in the Royal Library of the Royal Palace of Madrid by composer and musicologist Francisco Asenjo Barbieri, who transcribed and published it in 1890 with the title "Cancionero musical de los siglos XV y XVI" (Musical songbook of the 15th and 16th centuries).

== Works ==
The manuscript contains 458 works, the bulk of which are in Castilian, although a few works also appear in Latin, French, Catalan and Galician–Portuguese. It constitutes an anthology of the polyphonic music performed during the reign of the Catholic Monarchs.

The themes found in the songs are the most varied: romantic, religious, festive, chivalrous, satirical, pastoral, burlesque, political, historical, etc. accompanied by music of all styles: from popular folk songs to elaborate compositions. The musical form most important is the villancico, though other genres are also found as the romance and the canción. The majority of the works are for one voice with instrumental accompaniment but polyphonic works are also available for 2, 3 or 4 voices.

Below is a list of the composers present in the manuscript, with the number of works in parentheses:

- Juan del Encina (63)
- Luis de Milán (23)
- Gabriel Mena (18)
- Pedro de Escobar (17)
- Francisco de la Torre (15)
- Juan Ponce (12)
- Alonso de Mondéjar (11)
- Francisco de Peñalosa (10)
- Alonso (10)
- Badajoz (8)
- Jacobus de Milarte (6)
- Pedro de Lagarto (4)
- Juan de Anchieta (4)
- Juan de Urrede (3)
- Enrique (3)
- Garcimuñoz (3)
- Pedro Juan Aldomar (3)
- Juan Alvárez de Almorox (3)
- Alonso de Córdoba (3)
- Alfonso de Troya (3)
- Juan de Triana (3–2)
- Juan Cornago (3–2)
- Móxica (2)
- Juan Pérez de Gijón (2)
- Antonio de Ribera (2)
- Bernaldino de Brihuega (2)
- Alonso de Toro (2)
- Antonio de Contreras (2)
- Diego Fernández (2)
- Juan de Sanabria (2)
- Fernand Pérez de Medina (2)
- Juan de Espinosa (2)
- Josquin des Prez (1)
- Alonso Pérez de Alba (1)
- Lope de Baena (1)
- Ajofrín (1)
- Diego de Fermoselle (1)
- J. Rodríguez Torote (1)
- Juan de Valera (1)
- Lope Martínez (1)
- Lucas Fernández (1)
- Lucas (1)
- Roma (1)
- Salcedo (1)
- Sant Juan (1)
- Sedano (1)
- Pedro Hernández de Tordesillas (1)
- Vilches (1)
- Juan de León (1)
- Giovanni Brocco (1)
- Giacomo Fogliano (1)
- Bartolomeo Trombocino (1)

=== Complete list of works ===
Three different indexing systems are used in the table below:

- Nº = Index of works by title, in alphabetical order
- Bar. = Index used by Barbieri in his 1890 publication
- CMP = Index as found in the Cancionero. Because of the additions it received, there are duplicate works and many works not listed in the original index.

Nº	Bar.	CMP	Work	Voices	Composer	Genre	Concord.	Recordings	Remarks
1	376		Adonde tienes las mientes	3	(anonymous)				
2	377		Adonde tienes las mientes	4	(anonymous)				
3	309	444	Adoramoste, Señor, Dios y ombre verdadero	4	Francisco de la Torre	villancico			
4	310	420	Adoramoste, Señor, Dios y ombre Jhesu Christo	4	Francisco de la Torre		CMS		
5	325		Airado va el escudero	4	(anonymous)				
6	95	137	Ayrado va el gentilombre	4	Francisco de la Torre				
7	210		A la caça, sus, a la caça	4	Luchas				
8	6		Al alba venid, buen amigo	3	(anonymous)				
9	337		A la mia gran pena forte	4	(anonymous)				
10	321	106	Alburquerque, Alburquerque	3	(anonymous)				
11	453	371	Al çedaz, çedaz	4	Alonso de Toro				
12	30	40	Al dolor de mi cuydado	3	Juan Pérez de Gijón	canción	CMC, CMS		
13	275	457	Al dolor que siento estraño	3	Luis de Milán				
14	196	307	Alegraos, males esquivos	3	Francisco de Peñalosa				Text: Comendador Ávila
15	289	227	Alegria, alegria	4	Juan Ponce				
16	101		A los baños dell amor	3	(anonymous)				
17	294		Al Señor crucificado	3	(anonymous)				
18	439	321	Alta	3	Francisco de la Torre				Instrumental dance
19	336	152	Alça la voz, pregonero	4	(anonymous)				Text: Lope de Sosa
20	259	431	Alla se me ponga el sol	4	Juan Ponce				
21	365		Amigo Mingo Dominguez	3	(anonymous)				
22	79	102	Amor con fortuna	4	Juan del Encina			ANT, HES, ATR, DAN, THO, LAN, DIF, CAT, CDM	
23	174		Amor, fortuna y ventura	3	(anonymous)				
24	71		Amor por quien yo padezco	3	Diego de Fermoselle				
25	25		Amor que con gran porfía	3	(anonymous)				
26	169		Amor quiso cativarme	3	Alonso de Mondéjar				
27	396		Anagora se m'antoja	4	(anonymous)				
28	356		Andad acá, Domingo, hao	–	(anonymous)				Without music
29	181	279	Andad, pasiones, andad	3	Pedro de Lagarto	villancico	CMS, CMC		
30	135		Andarán siempre mis ojos	3	Gabriel Mena				
31	384		Antonilla es desposada	3	Juan del Encina			ANT, DAN, CHR, CAN, JOU	
32	209		Aquel caballero, madre, que de amores	3	(anonymous)				
33	227		Aquel caballero, madre, si morirá	3	(anonymous)				
34	207		Aquel gentilhombre, madre	3	(anonymous)				
35	426	243	Aquella buena muger	3	Juan de Triana	villancico	CMC		
36	164	254	Aquella mora garrida	4	Gabriel Mena				
37	299		A quien debo yo llamar	3	Juan del Encina			ANT	Text: Juan del Encina
38	405		Aqui viene la flor señoras	4	(anonymous)				
39	301		Arcangel San Miguel	3	Lope de Baena				
40	395		A repastar mi ganado	3	Lope de Baena				
41	410	132	A sombra de mis cabellos	3	Gabriel Mena				
42	411	360	A sombra de mis cabellos	4	Jacobus de Milarte				
43	338	324	A tal pérdida tan triste	4	Juan del Encina			ANT, HES	
44	235	362	A tierras agendas	3	Francisco de Peñalosa				
45	271		Aunque la pena d'ausente	3	(anonymous)				
46	251		Aunque mis ojos perdieron	3	(anonymous)				
47	216	336	Aunque no spero gozar	3	Luis de Milán				
48	414	159	Ave color vini clari	4	Juan Ponce				
49	296		Ave virgo gratia plena	4	(anonymous)				
50	429		Ay de le noble ville de Pris	4	(anonymous)				
51	175		Ay que non era	4	(anonymous)				
52	27	37	Ay, que non se rremediarme	3	Juan de León		CMC, Q16, BBU		
53	304		Ay Santa maria	3	(anonymous)		CMC		
54	378		Ay triste, que vengo	3	Juan del Encina				Text: Juan del Encina
55	139	207	Bien perdí mi coraçon	3	Juan Ponce				
56	178		Bien podrá mi desventura	3	(anonymous)				
57	424		Buen amor, no me deis guerra	3	(anonymous)				
58	318	100	Cavalleros de Alcalá	3	Lope Martinez				
59	433		Calabaza, no sé, buen amor	3	(anonymous)				
60	432	249	Caldero y llave, madona	4	Juan del Encina		MA7	ANT	
61	150		Calleis, mi señora	3	(anonymous)				
62	422	226	Callen todas las galanas	3	Pedro de Lagarto	villancico			
63	193		Cansados tengo los ojos	3	(anonymous)				
64	358		Carillo, muy mal me va	3	(anonymous)				
65	185		Cativo por libertarme	3	(anonymous)				
66	394		Comer y beber hasta rebentar	–	(anonymous)				Text: Juan del Encina? Without music
67	208	328	Como esta sola mi vida	4	Juan Ponce				
68	168		Como puedo ser contento	3	(anonymous)				
69	215	335	Con amores, la mi madre	4	Juan de Anchieta				
70	152		Congoja mas que cruél	3	Juan del Encina			ANT	
71	138		Con sí se tornó mi vida	3	(anonymous)				
72	355		Contarte quiero mis males	3	(anonymous)				
73	244	375	Coraçon triste, sofrid	3	Pedro de Escobar	villancico			
74	148		Creció tanto mi cuidado	3	(anonymous)				
75	406	94	Cucú, cucú, cucucú, guarda no lo seas tú	4	Juan del Encina			ANT, HES, RES, CAN, THO, FAG, NOT	
76	407	101	Cucú, cucú, cucucú, guarda no lo seas tú	4	(anonymous)				
77	373		Daca, bailemos, Carillo	3	Juan del Encina			ANT, CAM, FIC, PAN, CDM	Text: Juan del Encina
78	412		Dale si le das	3	(anonymous)				
79	7	8	Dama, mi grand querer	3	Móxica	canción	CMC		Text: Gran Cardenal?
80	281	32	Damos gracias a ti, Dios	3	Francisco de la Torre		CMS		
81	274		Dandome tal ocasion	3	(anonymous)				
82	435	255	D'aquel fraire flaco y cetrino	4	Pedro de Lagarto	villancico			
83	197	308	Desidme, pues sospirastes	3	Juan del Encina			ANT, MAG	Text: Juan del Encina
84	78		Deh fosse la qui mecho	4	(anonymous)				
85	362		Deja d'estar modorrido	4	Jacobus de Milarte				
86	147	217	De la dulce mi enemiga	4	Gabriel Mena				
87	361		De las sierras donde vengo	4	(anonymous)				
88	87		De la vida d'este mundo	3	(anonymous)				
89	200	315	De mi dicha no se spera	3	Francisco de Peñalosa				Text: Garci Sanchez de Badajoz
90	88		De mi vida descontento	3	(anonymous)				
91	403		De Monzón venia el mozo	3	(anonymous)				
92	237		Dentro en el vergel	4	(anonymous)				
93	155		De os servir toda mi vida	3	(anonymous)				
94	268		De pensar cuan triste peno	3	(anonymous)				
95	172		Descansa, triste pastor	3	Jacobus de Milarte				
96	416		Desciende al valle, niña	3	(anonymous)				
97	246	377	Descuidad d'ese cuidado	3	Juan de Sanabria				Text: Juan de Tapia
98	132	197	De ser mal casada	4	Diego Fernández				
99	277		D'estar sin poder miraros	3	(anonymous)				
100	54	66	De vivir vida segura	3	Juan Fernández de Madrid				
101	11	17	De vos i de mí quexoso	3	Juan de Urrede	canción	CMC, Q16		
102	136		De vosotros he mancilla	4	Juan de Espinosa				
103	83		Digas tú, el amor d'engaño	3	(anonymous)				
104	445	359	Dindirindin	4	(anonymous)		CMM(3)		In Macaronic language
105	313		Dios te salve, Cruz preciosa	4	(anonymous)				
106	283		Dios te salve, Pan de vida	3	(anonymous)				
107	306	417	Di por qué mueres en cruz	3	Lucas Fernández				Text: Lucas Fernández
108	307		Dixit Dominus Domino meo	4	(anonymous)				
109	63		Dolce amoroso focho	4	(anonymous)				
110	345	69	Domingo, fuese tu amiga	3	Bernaldino de Brihuega				
111	388		Domingo, ¿qué nuevas hay	3	Gabriel Mena				
112	291		Do mueren sin fenescer	3	(anonymous)				
113	298	404	Doncella madre de dios	3	Juan de Anchieta				
114	29		Doncella, no pregunteis	3	(anonymous)				
115	8	370	Donzella, por cuyo amor	2	J. Rodríguez Torote		CMC(3v)		Incomplete (one folio missing)
116	359		¿Donde está tu gallardía	3	(anonymous)				
117	326		Dormiendo está el caballero	4	(anonymous)				
118	115	177	Dos ánades, madre	3	Juan de Anchieta				
119	343	445	Durandarte, Durandarte	4	Francisco Millán				
120	56	68	El bien qu'stuve esperando	3	Sant Juan				
121	436		El cervel mi fa	4	(anonymous)				
122	250	383	El dia que vy a Pascuala	3	Pedro de Escobar	villancico			
123	454		Ell Abad que á tal hora anda	4	(anonymous)				
124	98	144	Ell amor que me bien quiere	3	Juan Ponce				
125	179		El que rige y el regido	3	Juan del Encina			ANT, HESENC, MAG, CAP	Text: Juan del Encina
126	254	395	El que tal señora tiene	3	Juan del Encina			ANT	Text: Juan del Encina
127	89	125	El triste que nunca os vió	3	Francisco de Peñalosa				
128	272	454	El bevir triste me haze	3	(anonymous)				
129	252		El vivo fuego de amor	4	(anonymous)				
130	76		Enamorado de vos	3	(anonymous)				
131	143		En Avila, mis ojos	3	(anonymous)				
132	255		En el mi corazon vos tengo	4	Gabriel Mena				
133	26		En el servicio de vos	3	(anonymous)				
134	4		Enemiga le soy, madre	3	(anonymous)				Text: Juan del Encina
135	5		Enemiga le soy, madre	3	Juan de Espinosa				Text: Juan del Encina
136	141		En fuego de amor me quemo	3	(anonymous)				
137	366	252- 297	En las sierras donde vengo	3	Pedro Juan Aldomar	villancico			
138	328	130	En memoria d'Alixandre	4	Juan de Anchieta				
139	137		En no me querer la vida	4	(anonymous)				
140	61		Entra mayo y sale Abril	4	(anonymous)				
141	308		Entre todos los nacidos	3	(anonymous)				
142	214		Es de tal metal mi mal	3	Luis de Milán				
143	36		Es la causa bien amar	3	Juan del Encina			ANT	Text: Juan del Encina
144	49		Es la vida que tenemos	3	(anonymous)				
145	57	70	Es por vos si tengo vida	3	Fernand Pérez de Medina				
146	287		Está la Reina del cielo	3	(anonymous)				
147	70		Es tan alta la ocasion	3	(anonymous)				
148	419		Esta queda loca	3	(anonymous)				
149	258		Estas noches á tan largas	3	(anonymous)				
150	292		Estrella oriental	3	(anonymous)				
151	455	421	Fata la parte	4	Juan del Encina			ANT, HES, CHR, CHA, ACC, MAG, CON, TER, CDM, CIB	
152	97		Fonte frida, fonte frida	3	(anonymous)				
153	341	424	Françeses, por qué rrazon	4	Tordesillas				
154	342	443	Françia, cuenta tu ganançia	4	Juan Ponce				
155	340	423	Gaeta nos es subjeta	4	Juan Alvárez de Almorox				
156	368		Gasajado vienes, Mingo	3	Jacobus de Milarte				
157	353	165	Gasajemonos de hucia	4	Juan del Encina			ANT	Text: Juan del Encina
158	28	38	Gentil dama, non se gana	4	Juan Cornago				
159	220		Gentilhombre enamorado	3	(anonymous)				
160	297		Gloria sea al glorioso	3	(anonymous)				
161	392	385	Gran plaçer siento yo ya	4	Pedro de Escobar	villancico			
162	401	15	Gritos davan en aquella sierra	3	Alonso				
163	124		Guarda, donna il mio tormento	4	(anonymous)				
164	452	393	Guardaos d'estas pitofleras	3	Alonso				
165	348	89	Ha, Pelayo, que desmayo	3	Pedro Juan Aldomar	villancico	UPS(4v)		
166	19	26	Harto de tanta porfia	4	(anonymous)		CMS(3v)		Text: Íñigo López de Mendoza, 1st Marquess of Santillana
167	198		Hermitaño quiero ser	4	Juan del Encina			ANT, CHR	Text: Juan del Encina
168	166		Hermosura con ufana	3	(anonymous)				
169	357	174	Hoy comamos y bebamos	4	Juan del Encina			ANT, HES, PAR, KIN, GEN, DAN, WAV, ROM, REN, ACC, VIR, SAV, UMB, ORL, DUF, CDM, ROS	Text: Juan del Encina
170	77		I arded, corazón, arded	4	(anonymous)				
171	188		I haz jura, menga	3	(anonymous)				
172	68	84	In te, Domine, speravi	4	Josquin des Prez				
173	261	435	Io mi voglio lamentare	4	Giovanni Brocco	frottola			
174	431		Jançu Janto dego de garcigorreta	3	(anonymous)				
175	243	374	Juisio fuerte será dado	3	Alonso de Córdoba				
176	32	42	Justa fue mi perdiçion	3	Francisco de la Torre		CMS		Text: Jorge Manrique
177	158	234	La bella mal maridada	4	Gabriel Mena				
178	75		La congoja que partió	3	(anonymous)				
179	350		La más graciosa serrana	4	(anonymous)				
180	223	343	La mi sola Laureola	4	Juan Ponce				
181	73	91	L'amor, donna, ch'io ti porto	4	Giacomo Fogliano	frottola	PBN, FRO		
182	38	48	La que tengo no es prision	3	Francisco de la Torre				Text: Conde de Cifuentes
183	48	59	Las mis penas, madre	4	Pedro de Escobar	villancico			
184	44		Las tristezas no me espantan	3	(anonymous)				
185	430	247	La tricotea San martin la vea	3	Alonso				
186	153		La vida y la gloria	3	(anonymous)				
187	442		La zorrilla con el gallo	3	(anonymous)				
188	316	184	Levanta, Pascual, Levanta	3	Juan del Encina			ANT, HES, NEF, ACC, RES, MIN, FIC, CAP, REI	Text: Juan del Encina
189	236		Lo que demanda el romero	4	(anonymous)				
190	249	382	Lo que mucho se desea	2	Francisco de Peñalosa				
191	145	216	Lo que queda es lo seguro	3	Pedro de Escobar	villancico	CME, MA7, PAR		Text: Garci Sánchez de Badajoz
192	146	99	Lo que queda es lo seguro	3	(anonymous)				Text: Garci Sánchez de Badajoz
193	344	446	Los braços trayo cansados	3	Luis de Milán				
194	163		Los que amor y fe se tienen	3	(anonymous)				
195	108		Los sospiros no sosiegan	4	Juan del Encina		MA7	ANT, GOT, BEG, CDM	
196	456		Llueve menudico	3	(anonymous)				
197	46	57	Malos adalides fueron	3	Badajoz				
198	53		Mano á mano los dos amores	3	(anonymous)				
199	239		Maravilla es cómo bivo	3	Luis de Milán				
200	67		Mas quiero morir por veros	4	Juan del Encina			ANT	Text: Juan del Encina
201	190	298	Mas vale trocar	4	Juan del Encina			ANT, HES, KIN, GEN, CHR, ROM, BIN, VIR, MAG	Text: Juan del Encina
202	349	118	Mayoral del hato, ahau	3	Juan de Sanabria				
203	380		Menga la del bustar	3	(anonymous)				
204	437		Meu naranjedo non te fruta	4	(anonymous)				
205	458		Meus olhos van per lo mare	4	(anonymous)				
206	441	346	Miedo m'e del Chiromiro	3	Alonso de Córdoba				
207	295		Mi esperanza	3	(anonymous)				
208	64		Mi libertad en sosiego	4	Juan del Encina			ANT, GOT, CAN, BIN, MIN, MAG, DUF	Text: Juan del Encina
209	142		Mill cosas tiene ell amor	3	(anonymous)				
210	41		Mi mal por bien es tenido	4	Badajoz				
211	176		Mi muerte contra la vida	3	(anonymous)				
212	50		Minno amor dexistes ay	3	(anonymous)				
213	119	185	Mios fueron, mi coraçon	3	Luis de Milán				
214	120	294	Mios fueron, mi coraçon	3	Alonso de Mondéjar				
215	243		Mi querer nunca mudado	3	Alonso de Córdoba				
216	21	29	Mi querer tanto vos quiere	4	Enrique	canción	CMC		
217	103	153	Mi ventura, el caballero	3	Gabriel Mena				
218	195		Mi vida nunca reposa	3	(anonymous)				
219	322		Morirse quiere Alixandre	3	(anonymous)				
220	34	44	Mortal tristura me dieron	4	Juan del Encina			ANT, HES	
221	74		Muchos van de amor heridos	4	(anonymous)				
222	459		(Música de una composición a la que falta la letra)	3	(anonymous)				
223	319	103	Muy crueles voces dan	3	(anonymous)		CMC		
224	16	23	Muy triste será mi vida	4	Juan de Urrede	canción	CMC(3v)		Text: Rodriguez del Padrón
225	354	167	Ninguno çierre las puertas	3	Juan del Encina			ANT	Text: Juan del Encina
226	58	72	Niña, erguídeme los ojos	3	Francisco de Peñalosa				
227	59	108	Niña, erguídeme los ojos	3	(anonymous)				
228	60	403	Niña, erguídeme los ojos	3	Alonso				
229	374		Niño amigo, ¿donde bueno?	3	(anonymous)				Text: Jorge de Mercado
230	105		No debe seguir amores	3	(anonymous)				
231	149	220	No devo dar culpa a vos	3	Pedro de Escobar	villancico			
232	191		No desmayes, coraçon	3	Alonso de Mondéjar				
233	170	262	No fie nadie en amor	3	Francisco de la Torre				
234	45	56	No ay plazer en esta vida	4	Fernand Pérez de Medina				
235	159		No he ventura, mezquino yo	3	(anonymous)				
236	379		No husies de buen tempero	3	Luis de Milán				
237	451	391	No me le digais mal, madre	3	Alonso Pérez de Alba				
238	24		Non me place nin consiento	3	(anonymous)				
239	182		No penseis vos, pensamiento	3	Alonso de Mondéjar				
240	123		No podrá maravillarse	3	(anonymous)				
241	160		No podran ser acavadas	3	Alonso de Mondéjar				
242	118		No puede el que os ha mirado	4	Gabriel Mena				
243	408	114	No pueden dormir mis ojos	4	Pedro de Escobar	villancico			
244	234		No puedo apartarme	4	(anonymous)				
245	162		No querades, fija	3	(anonymous)				
246	15	22	No queriendo soys querida	3	Móxica	canción	MA6, RIC		
247	205		No quiero que nadie sienta	3	(anonymous)				
248	398		No quiero ser monja, no	3	(anonymous)				
249	247		No quiero tener querer	3	(anonymous)			ANT	Text: Juan del Encina
250	369		Norabuena vengas, Menga	3	(anonymous)				
251	370		Norabuena vengas, Menga	3	(anonymous)				
252	35		No se puede llamar fe	3	Juan del Encina			ANT	Text: Juan del Encina
253	229		No soy yo quien la descubre	3	Gabriel Mena				
254	226		No teneis la culpa vos	3	Alonso de Mondéjar				
255	107	162	No tienen vado mis males	4	Juan del Encina		CME, UPS	ANT, GUI	
256	364	229	Nuestr'ama, Minguillo	3	Pedro de Escobar	villancico			
257	278		Nuestro bien e gran consuelo	3	(anonymous)				
258	372	281	Nuevas te traigo, Carillo	4	Juan del Encina		CMC	ANT	Text: Juan del Encina
259	1	1	Nunca fue pena mayor	3	Juan de Urrede	canción	CMC, CMS, PIX, GAL, OXF, Q16, Q17, Q18, MA6, MA8, RIC, PER, CGC, VER, CHI, HAR, SPI		Text: Duque de Alba
260	126	192	Nunca yo, señora, os viera	3	Antonio de Ribera	villancico			
261	440		Ñar ñarete, giron giron bete	3	(anonymous)				
262	286	124	O alto bien sin reves	3	Pedro de Escobar??				
263	303	413	O ascondida verdad	3	Alfonso de Troya				
264	86		O bendita sea la hora	3	Gabriel Mena				
265	339		O castillo de Montanges	3	(anonymous)			ANT, CHR	Music: attrib. to Enzina
266	51	62	O quan dulçe serias, muerte	3	Francisco de la Torre				
267	276		O cuan triste y cuan penado	3	(anonymous)				
268	130		O cuidado mensajero	3	Gabriel Mena				
269	39	49	O desdichado de mi	3	Badajoz				
270	134	200- 211?	O dichoso y desdichado	4	Juan Alvárez de Almorox				
271	270	452	O dulce y triste memoria	3	Luis de Milán				
272	390		O que ama tan garrida	3	Alonso de Toro				
273	302		O Reyes magos benditos	3	Juan del Encina			ANT	Text: Juan del Encina
274	257	405	O triste, qu'estoy penado	3	Juan Ponce				
275	37		O triunfante dona	3	(anonymous)				
276	311		O Virgen muy gloriosa	3	(anonymous)				
277	144		Ojos mis ojos, tan garridos ojos	3	(anonymous)				
278	171	263	Ojos morenicos	3	Pedro de Escobar	villancico			
279	425		Olhademe, gentil dona	4	(anonymous)				
280	386		Ora baila tú, mas baila tutú	3	(anonymous)				
281	347	73	Ora sus, pues qu'ansí es	4	Pedro de Escobar	villancico			
282	282	55	O sancta clemens, o pia	3	Alfonso de Troya				
283	253		Otro bien si á vos no tengo	3	(anonymous)				
284	447		Otro tal misacantano	3	(anonymous)				
285	156		O vos omnes qui transitis	3	Luis de Milán				
286	444	358	O voy		Roma	4			
287	241	373	Oyan todos mi tormento	4	Alonso de Mondéjar				
288	242		Oyan todos mi tormento	4	Gabriel Mena				
289	280	28	Oya tu merçed y crea	3	(anonymous)		CMC, CMS		Text: Juan de Mena
290	180		Paguen mis ojos, pues vieron	3	Juan del Encina			ANT	Text: Juan del Encina
291	399	11	Pánpano verde	4	Francisco de la Torre				
292	129		Para que mi pensamiento	3	Luis de Milán				
293	230		Para verme con ventura	3	Juan del Encina		CMS, UPS	ANT, GUI	Text: Juan del Encina
294	231		Para verme con ventura	3	(anonymous)				Text: Juan del Encina
295	232	175	Para verme con ventura	3	Juan Ponce				Text: Juan del Encina
296	55		Partir, corazón, partir	3	Juan del Encina			ANT	
297	121		Partístesos, mis amores	3	Juan del Encina			ANT	
298	217	337	Pasame, por Dios, varquero	3	Pedro de Escobar	villancico	CME, LIS		
299	331	136	Pascua de'Espíritu Santo	3	Francisco de la Torre				
300	446		Pase el agua, ma Julieta	4	(anonymous)				
301	427	244	Paseisme aor'alla, serrana	3	Pedro de Escobar	villancico			
302	428	245	Paseisme ahora allá, serrana	4	Pedro de Escobar				
303	363		Pastorcico, non te aduermas	3	(anonymous)				
304	371		Pedro, y bien te quiero	3	Juan del Encina			ANT, DAN, ACC, CON, CDM	Text: Juan del Encina
305	387	428	Pelayo, tan buen esfuerço	3	Juan del Encina		CMB	ANT	
306	33	43	Peligroso pensamiento	3	Francisco de la Torre		CMS		
307	102		Pensad ora'n al	3	(anonymous)				
308	99		Pensamiento, ve do vas	4	(anonymous)		CMC		
309	266		Perche me fuge amore	3	(anonymous)				
310	434		Perdi la mi rueca	3	(anonymous)				
311	449	387	Pero Gonçalez	3	Alonso				
312	329		Pésame de vos, el Conde	4	Juan del Encina			ANT	
313	389	364	Plaçer y gasajo	4	Alonso				
314	47	58	Plega a Dios que alguno quieras	3	(anonymous)				
315	43	53	Poco a poco me rodean	3	Badajoz	3			
316	423	235	Por beber, comadre	3	Juan de Triana	villancico	CMC		
317	23	31	Por las gracias que teneis	3	Juan Fernández de Madrid				
318	438	311	Por las sierras de Madrid	6	Francisco de Peñalosa				
319	335	150	Por los campos de los moros	3	Francisco de la Torre				
320	69		Por Mayo era, por Mayo	4	(anonymous)				Text: Don Alonso de Cardona??
321	203	319	Porque de ageno cuidado	3	Luis de Milán				
322	140	200- 211?	Porque vos ví	4	Juan Alvárez de Almorox				
323	233	355	Por serviros, triste yo	3	Ajofrín				
324	81	107	Por unos puertos arriva	4	Antonio de Ribera	romance		ANT	Text: Juan del Encina
325	245		Por vos mal me viene	3	(anonymous)				
326	248		Pues amas, triste amador	3	(anonymous)			ANT	Text: Juan del Encina; Music: attrib. to Encina
327	450	389	Pues bien para esta	4	Garcimuñoz				
328	10	16	Pues con sobra de tristura	3	Enrique	canción	CMC(4v)		
329	285		Pues es muerto el Rey del cielo	3	(anonymous)				
330	213	333	Pues la vida en mal tan fuerte	3	Luis de Milán				Music: same as in Si ell esperança es dudosa
331	194		Pues no te duele mi muerte	4	Juan del Encina			ANT	Text: Juan del Encina
332	2	2	Pues que Dios te fizo tal	3	Juan Cornago		CMC		
333	3	5	Pues que Dios te fizo tal	3	Juan Fernández de Madrid	canción			Work by Juan Cornago; triple added by Juan Fernández de Madrid
334	22		Pues que jamás olvidaros	4	Juan del Encina		CMS, MA7, DEF	ANT, PAL, ACC, CAP	
335	125		Pues que mi triste penar	3	Juan del Encina			ANT, JOU	Text: Juan del Encina
336	112		Pues que no os doleis del mal	3	(anonymous)				
337	211	331	Pues que todo os descontenta	3	Francisco de la Torre				
338	314		Pues que tú, Reina del cielo	3	(anonymous)			ANT, CAN	Text: Juan del Encina
339	224		Pues que vuestro desamor	3	(anonymous)				
340	177	271	Pues que ya nunca nos veis	4	Juan del Encina			ANT, LAN	
341	20	27	Pues serviçio vos desplase	4	Enrique	canción	PER		Text: Monsalve? Music: attrib. to Robert Morton in PER.
342	90	127	Pues vivo en perder la vida	3	Francisco de Peñalosa				
343	116		Puse mis amores	3	Badajoz				
344	92	129	Que bien me lo veo	3	Salcedo				
345	93	139	Que bien me lo veo	4	(anonymous)				
346	106	158	Quedaos, adios.- ¿A donde vais?	4	Pedro de Escobar	villancico			
347	382	304	Quedate, Carillo, adios	4	Juan del Encina			ANT, HES	
348	352		Que desgraciada zagala	3	Lope de Baena				
349	187	290	Que dolor mas me doliera	3	Francisco de Peñalosa				
350	72	90	Quexome de ti, ventura	3	Pedro de Lagarto	romance			
351	100		Que mas bien aventuransa	3	Luis de Milán				
352	212	332	Qué mayor desaventura	3	Antonio de Contreras				Text: Vizconde de Altamira
353	131	198	Qué me quereis, caballero	3	(anonymous)				
354	173		Qué puedo perder que pierda	3	Luis de Milán				
355	114		Queredme bien, caballero	3	Gabriel Mena				
356	315	74	Qu'es de ti desconsolado	3	Juan del Encina			ANT, HES, SPA, DAN, ROM, ARA, ACC, OLA, PAN, CDM, REI	Text: Juan del Encina
357	151	222	Qué vida terná sin vos	3	Bernaldino de Brihuega				Text: Diego de Quirós
358	167		Quien pone su aficion	3	Badajoz				
359	122	187	Quien tal arbol pone	3	Alfonso de Troya				
360	360		Quien te hizo, Juan pastor	3	Badajoz				
361	82	283	Quien te traxo, cavallero	3	Juan del Encina		CME	ANT, MAP, CIB	Text: Juan del Encina
362	52		Quien vevir libre desea	3	(anonymous)				
363	85		Quien vos habia de llevar	4	(anonymous)				
364	199		Razon, que fuerça no quiere	4	Juan del Encina			ANT	Text: Juan del Encina
365	391		Recuerda, Carillo Juan	–	(anonymous)				Without music
366	279	19	Reyna y Madre de Dios	1	(anonymous)				
367	201		Remediad, señora mia	3	Juan del Encina			ANT	Text: Juan del Encina
368	202		Remediad, señora mia	3	(anonymous)				Text: Juan del Encina
369	165		Remedio para bevir	3	Alonso de Mondéjar				
370	262	436	Revelose mi cuidado	3	Juan del Encina			ANT	
371	400		Rodrigo Martinez	2	(anonymous)	villancico			Music incomplete
372	288		Rogad vos, Virgen, rogad	3	Lope de Baena				
373	240	369	Romerico, tú que vienes	3	Juan del Encina		CME, CMS	ANT, VAL, BER, COM, ALT, SPI, DAE, UFF	Text: Juan del Encina
374	320		Rómpase la sepoltura	3	(anonymous)				
375	31	41	Ruego a Dios que amando mueras	3	Juan Pérez de Gijón	canción			
376	133	199	Sacaronme los pesares	3	Pedro de Escobar	villancico	CME, LIS, PAR		Text: Garci Sánchez de Badajoz
377	42	52	Señora, cual soy venido	3	(anonymous)	villancico	CMC		Text: Íñigo López de Mendoza, 1st Marquess of Santillana; Music: In CMC the triple is attrib. to Juan Cornago and the bass to Juan de Triana.
378	66		Señora de hermosura	4	Juan del Encina			ANT, BIN, CDM	
379	219	339	Señora, despues que os vi	3	Luis de Milán				Text: Diego de Quirós
380	273		Señora, vuestro valor	3	(anonymous)				
381	346	71	Serrana del bel mirar	3	Luis de Milán				
382	218		Serviros y bien amaros	3	Juan del Encina			ANT	
383	263		Serviros ya y no oso	1	(anonymous)				Only a fragment of the triple available
384	332		Setenil, ay Setenil	–	(anonymous)				Without music
385	65	178	Sy amor pone las escalas	4	Juan del Encina			ANT, CDM	Text: Juan del Encina
386	323		Si d'amor pena sentis	4	(anonymous)				
387	238	367	Si dolor sufro secreto	3	Luis de Milán				
388	228	351	Si ell esperança es dudosa	3	Luis de Milán				Music: same as in Pues la vida en mal tan fuerte
389	9		Siempre creçe mi serviros	3	Juan Fernández de Madrid		CMC		
390	448		Si habéis dicho, marido	3	(anonymous)				
391	415	179	Si abrá en este baldrés	4	Juan del Encina			ANT, HES, KIN, ROM, ACC, PIF, VIR, CDM	
392	192		Si la noche es temerosa	3	(anonymous)				
393	127		Si lo dicen, digan	4	(anonymous)				
394	189	252- 297	Si mi señora m'olvida	3	Pedro Juan Aldomar	villancico			
395	128		Sy no piensas remediar	3	Luis de Milán				
396	330	135	Sobre baza estaba el Rey	3	(anonymous)				
397	402		So ell encina encina	4	(anonymous)				
398	420		Sola me dejastes	3	(anonymous)				
399	421		Sola me dejastes	4	Gabriel Mena				
400	404		Sol sol gi gi a b c	3	Alonso				
401	225		Sospiros, no me dejeis	3	Badajoz				
402	154		Sospiros, pues que descansa	3	Alonso de Mondéjar				
403	40		Soy contento y vos servida	3	Juan del Encina			ANT	Text: Juan del Encina
404	91		Soy doncella enamorada	3	(anonymous)				
405	204	323	Sufriendo con fe tan fuerte	3	Luis de Milán				
406	109		Tales son mis pensamientos	3	Alonso de Mondéjar				
407	269		Tal es su valor presente	3	(anonymous)				
408	393	426	Tan buen ganadico	4	Juan del Encina			ANT, CAN, OAK, TER, MAP	Text: Juan del Encina
409	267	448	Temeroso de sufrir	3	Luis de Milán				
410	333		Tiempo es, ell escudero	3	(anonymous)				
411	284		Tierra y cielo se quejaban	3	(anonymous)				
412	397	6	Tir'alla, que non quiero	3	Alonso				
413	184	287	Todo quanto yo serví	3	Lope de Baena				
414	104	156	Todo mi bien e perdido	4	Juan Ponce				
415	113		Todos duermen, corazon	3	Lope de Baena				
416	265		Todos los bienes del mundo	4	Juan del Encina		MA7	ANT, JOC, RIC, ACC, MAG, CAT, CON, WIM, REI, DAE	
417	256		Todos van de amor heridos	4	Jacobus de Milarte				
418	221	341	Torre de la niña, y date	2	Juan Ponce				
419	222		Torre de la niña, y date	4	(anonymous)				
420	17	24	Tres morillas m'enamoran	3	(anonymous)				
421	18	25	Tres moricas m'enamoran	3	Diego Fernández				
422	317	83	Triste España sin ventura	4	Juan del Encina			ANT, HES, RES, MUN, MAD, NEF, CAN, LAN, OLA, CAP, NOT	
423	334		Triste está la reyna, triste	4	Antonio de Contreras				
424	96	140	Triste, que será de mí	4	Francisco de la Torre				
425	12	18	Tristesa, quien a mi vos dio	3	Alonso				
426	13	112	Tristeza, quien a mi os dio	4	(anonymous)				
427	457	447	Tu que vienes de camino	2	Francisco de Peñalosa				
428	375	285	Una amiga tengo, hermano	3	Juan del Encina		CME	ANT, CON	Text: Juan del Encina
429	351	154	Una montaña pasando	4	Garcimuñoz				
430	327	126	Una sañosa porfía	4	Juan del Encina			ANT, HES, COH, CHR, WAV, CAM, MIN, FIC, OLA	
431	206		Unos ojos morenicos	3	(anonymous)				
432	417		Un, señora, muerto habías	4	(anonymous)				
433	94		Un solo fin de mis males	3	Alonso de Mondéjar				
434	367		Vamos, vamos á cenar	3	Jacobus de Milarte				
435	409	122	Ved, comadres, que dolençia	4	Luis de Milán				
436	183	286	Vençedores son tus ojos	3	Pedro de Escobar	villancico			
437	111		Vida y alma el que os mirare	3	Gabriel Mena				
438	460	455	Viejo malo en la mi cama	4	Sedano				
439	305	416	Virgen bendita sin par	4	Pedro de Escobar	villancico			
440	312	430	Virgen dina y muy fermosa	3	Alonso				
441	293		Vos mayor, vos meor	3	Lope de Baena				
442	80	105	Vox clamantis in deserto	3	Bartolomeo Trombocino	fottola	FR3		Text: Serafino dall' Aquila
443	117		Vuestros amores he, señora	4	Juan del Encina			ANT, CHR, DUF	
444	157		Vuestros ojos morenillos	3	(anonymous)				
445	413	155	Ya cantan los gallos	4	Vilches		CME		
446	186		Ya cerradas son las puertas	3	Juan del Encina			ANT	Text: Juan del Encina
447	110	166	Ya murieron los placeres	3	Garcimuñóz				
448	264	439	Ya no quiero aver plaser	3	Juan de Valera				
449	381		Ya no quiero ser vaquero	3	Juan del Encina		CMS	ANT	Text: Juan del Encina
450	300		Ya no quiero tener fe	3	Juan del Encina		CMS	ANT, MAY, DAE, BOR	
451	385		Ya no spero qu'en mi vida	3	Juan del Encina			ANT	
452	260		Ya no teneis mal que darme	3	(anonymous)				
453	290		Ya somos del todo libres	4	(anonymous)				
454	383		Ya soy desposado	3	Juan del Encina			ANT, CAM, VIR	Text: Juan del Encina
455	14	21	Yo con vos, señora	3	(anonymous)				
456	84		Yo creo que no os dio Dios	3	Gabriel Mena				
457	324		Yo me soy la Reina viuda	4	(anonymous)				
458	62		Yo me staba reposando	4	Juan del Encina			ANT, SEP	Text: Juan del Encina
459	161		Yo pensé que mi ventura	4	Gabriel Mena				
460	418		Zagalega del Casar	4	(anonymous)				
461	443	357	Çutegon e singuel deriquegon	3	(anonymous)				

== Concordance with other musical sources ==
=== Manuscripts ===
- CMB – Barcelona, Biblioteca de Catalunya, Ms 454 (Cancionero de Barcelona) (E-Bbc 454)
- BBU – Bologne, Biblioteca Universitaria, Ms. 596.HH.2/4 (I-Bu 596.HH.2/4) (Tablature for keyboard)
- Q16 – Bologne, Civico Museo Bibliografico Musicale, MS Q16 (I-Bc Q 16)
- Q17 – Bologne, Civico Museo Bibliografico Musicale, MS Q17 (I-Bc Q 17)
- Q18 – Bologne, Civico Museo Bibliografico Musicale, MS Q18 (I-Bc Q 18)
- CHI – Chicago, The Newberry Library, Case MS VM C. 25 (US-Cn Case ms. VM 140 C.25) (Lute book by Vincenzo Capirola)
- COI – Coimbra, Biblioteca Geral da Universidade, MS M.12 (P-Cug M.12)
- CME – Elvas, Biblioteca Municipal Públia Hortênsia, Ms 11793 (Cancioneiro de Elvas) (P-Em 11793)
- MA7 – Florence, Biblioteca Nazionale Centrale, Ms. Magl. XIX. 107 bis (I-Fn Magl.XIX 107 bis)
- MA6 – Florence, Biblioteca Nazionale Centrale, Ms. Magl. XIX. 176 (I-Fn Magl.XIX 176)
- MA8 – Florence, Biblioteca Nazionale Centrale, Ms. Magl. XIX. 178 (I-Fn Magl.XIX 178)
- RIC – Florence, Biblioteca Riccardiana, MS. 2356 (I-Fr 2356)
- LIS – Lisbon, Biblioteca Nacional Colecção Dr. Ivo Cruz, MS 60 (Cancioneiro de Lisboa) (P-Ln Res C.I.C. 60)
- CMM – Madrid, Biblioteca de la Casa del Duque de Medinaceli, Ms 13230 (Cancionero de Medinaceli)
- OXF – Oxford, Bodleian Library, MS. Ashmole 831 (GB-Ob Ashmole 831)
- PAR – Paris, Bibliothèque École Nationale Supérieure des Beaux-Arts, Masson 56) (Cancioneiro de Paris) (F-Pba 56: Masson)
- PIX – Paris, Bibliothèque Nationale, fonds française 15123 (Chansonnier Pixérécourt) (F-Pn 15123)
- PBN – Paris, Bibliothèque Nationale, Ms Rés. Vm 676
- PER – Perugia, Biblioteca Comunale Augusta, Ms. 431 (olim G20) (I-PEc 431)
- CGC – Rome, Biblioteca Apostolica Vaticana, C. G.XIII. 2 7 (Cappella Giulia Chansonnier) (V-CVbav CG XIII.27 ).
- GAL – Saint Gall, Stiftsbibliothek, MS 463 (CH-SGs 463) (Tschudi Liederbuch)
- CMS – Segovia, Catedral, Archivo Capitular, s.s. (Cancionero de Segovia) (E-SE s.s)
- CMC – Sevilla, Catedral Metropolitana, Biblioteca Capitular y Colombina, Ms. 7-I-28 (Cancionero de la Colombina) (E-S 7-I-28)
- VER – Verona, Biblioteca Capitolare. MS 752 (I-VEcap 757)
- TAR – Tarazona, Archivo Capitular de la Catedral, ms. 2/3 (E-TZ 2/3)

=== Printed books ===
- HAR – Harmonice Musices Odhecaton, A. O. Petrucci, Venice, 1501
- FRO – Frottole Libro septimo. Petrucci
- FR3 – Frottole Libro tertio. Petrucci
- SPI – Intabulatura de lauto, libro primo. F. Spinacino, 1507
- UPS – Cancionero de Uppsala
- DEF – João IV de Portugal, "Defensa de la música moderna" (Lisbon, 1649)

== Discography ==
- ???? – [ANT] Obra Musical Completa de Juan del Enzina. M.A.Tallante. Pro Mvsica Antiqva de Madrid y solistas. M.E.C.
- ???? – [MAY] Mayrat. El Viaje del Agua. Grupo Odres. Saga WKPD-10/2035.
- 1960 – [ANG] Victoria de los Ángeles – Spanish Songs of the Renaissance. Victoria de los Ángeles. Barcelona Ars Musicae. José Maria Lamaña. . Se puede encontrar en CD ensamblado con otras grabaciones en: Victoria de los Ángeles – Cantos de España. EMI Classics 7243 5 66 937 2 2 (4 CDs).
- 1968 – [RES] Music from the Time of Christopher Columbus. Musica Reservata. Philips 432 821-2 PM.
- 1970 – [EMC] Music of the Royal Courts of Europe 1150–1600. Early Music Consort of London. David Munrow. Reeditado en CD como: The Pleasures of the Royal Courts. Elektra Nonesuch 9 71326-2.
- 1971 – [VAL] El Camino de Santiago. Cantos de peregrinación. Escolanía y Capilla Musical de la Abadía del Valle de los Caídos. Leoncio Diéguez. Laurentino Saenz de Buruaga. Cuarteto y Grupo de Instrumentos Antiguos Renacimiento. Ramón Perales de la Cal. EMI (Odeón) 7243 5 67051 2 8.
- 1973 – [MUN] Music from the court of Ferdinand and Isabella. Early Music Consort of London. David Munrow.. Se puede encontrar en CD ensamblado con otras grabaciones en: Music for Ferdinand and Isabella of Spain – Instruments of the Middle Ages & Renaissance. Testament SBT 1251 .
- 1974 – [BER] Old Spanish Songs. Spanish songs from the Middle Ages and Renaissance. Teresa Berganza. Narciso Yepes. . Se puede encontrar en CD ensamblado con otras grabaciones en: Canciones españoles. Deutsche Grammophon 435 648-2.
- 1974 – [JOC] Antik Musik på Wik – Early Music at Wik. Joculatores Upsaliensis. . Se puede encontrar en CD ensamblado con otras grabaciones en: Antik Musik på Wik – Early Music at Wik. Bis CD 3.
- 1976 – [SPA] Weltliche Musik im Christlichen und Jüdischen Spanien (1450–1550). Hespèrion XX. Jordi Savall. Virgin Veritas Edition 61591 (2 CDs).
- 1977 – [PAR] Ars Antiqua de Paris à la Sainte Chapelle. Ars Antiqua de Paris. Coda 9605-1.
- 1979 – [ATR] Villancicos – Chansons populaires espagnoles des XVe et XVIe siècles. Atrium Musicae de Madrid. Gregorio Paniagua. Harmonia mundi "Musique d'Abord" HMA 190 1025.
- 1980 – [MAD] La Spagna. 15th & 17th Century Spanish Variations. Atrium Musicae de Madrid. Gregorio Paniagua. Bis CD-163.
- 1984 – [COM] Romeros y Peregrinos. Grupo Universitario de Cámara de Compostela. Carlos Villanueva. EMI Classics CB-067.
- 1986 – [COH] L'homme armé: 1450–1650. Musique de guerre et de paix. Boston Camerata. Joel Cohen. Erato ECD 88168.
- 1987 – [KIN] Music from the Spanish Kingdoms. Circa 1500 Ensemble. CRD 3447.
- 1988 – [RIC] Music from the time of Richard III. Yorks Waits. Saydisc CD-SDL 364.
- 1988 – [GEN] Musica dell'época di Cristoforo Colombo. I Madrigalisti di Genova. L. Gamberini. Ars Nova CDAN 173.
- 1989 – [DAN] El Cancionero Musical de Palacio. Musik aus der Zeit der Katholischen Könige in Spanien, 1450–1550. Ensemble Danserye. Preiser Records 90028.
- 1991 – [DAE] El Cancionero de la Catedral de Segovia. Ensemble Daedalus. Roberto Festa. Accent ACC 9176. 1991. Contiene Justa fue mi perdiçión.
- 1991 – [HES] Juan del Encina: Romances y villancicos. Jordi Savall. Hespèrion XX. Astrée (Naïve) ES 9925.
- 1991 – [PAL] El Cancionero de Palacio, 1474–1516. Música en la corte de los Reyes Católicos. Hespèrion XX. Jordi Savall. Astrée (Naïve) ES 9943.
- 1991 – [CHR] From a Spanish Palace Songbook. Music from the time of Christopher Columbus. Margaret Philpot, Shirley Rumsey, Christopher Wilson. Hyperion "Helios" 55097.
- 1991 – [CHA] Chansons – Danses – Musiques Médiévales et Renaissances. Ensemble Jehan de Channey. De plein Vent CD 1989–04.
- 1992 – [NEF] Music for Joan the Mad. Spain 1479–1555. La Nef. Sylvain Bergeron. Dorian Discovery 80128.
- 1992 – [WAV] 1492 – Music from the age of discovery. Waverly Consort. Michael Jaffee. EMI Reflexe 54506.
- 1992 – Music From the Time of Columbus. Philip Pickett. New London Consort. Linn Records.
- 1993 – [ALT] In Gottes Namen fahren wir. Pilgerlieder aus Mittelalter und Renaissance. Odhecaton, Ensemble für alte Musik, Köln. FSM 97 208.
- 1993 – [GOT] The Voice in the Garden. Spanish Songs and Motets, 1480–1550. Gothic Voices. Christopher Page. Hyperion 66653.
- 1994 – [SEP] Sephardic Songs in the Hispano-Arabic tradition of medieval Spain. (Canciones Sefardies de la tradición hispanoárabe en la España medieval. Ballads of the Sephardic Jews). Sarband. Vladimir Ivanoff. Jaro 4206-2. Sonifolk 21 115. Dorian Recordings DOR-93190.
- 1995 – [CAN] Canciones, Romances, Sonetos. From Juan del Encina to Lope de Vega. La Colombina. Accent 95111.
- 1995 – [ROM] Al alva venid. Música profana de los siglos XV y XVI. La Romanesca. José Miguel Moreno. Glossa 920203.
- 1995 – [CAM] Songs and dances from the Spanish Renaissance. Camerata Iberia. MA Records MA 035A.
- 1995 – [THO] A Royal Songbook. Spanish Music from the time of Columbus. Musica Antiqua of London. Philip Thorby. Naxos 8.553325.
- 1995 – [LAN] Landscapes. Three centuries of world music. David Bellugi et al. Frame 9506.
- 1995 – [RON] A Song of David. Music of the Sephardim and Renaissance Spain. La Rondinella. Dorian Discovery DIS-80130.
- 1995 – [REN] Odyssey. Progressive Performance of ancient songs. New World Renaissance Band. Nightwatch 1006.
- 1995 – [ARA] Des Croisades à Don Quichotte. Musique du pourtour méditerranéen (XIIe-XVIe siècles). Ensemble vocal et instrumental Arabesque. Domitille de Bienassis. Solstice SOCD 125.
- 1996 – [ACC] Cancionero Musical de Palacio. Ensemble Accentus. Thomas Wimmer. Naxos 8.553536.
- 1996 – [BIN] Sola m'ire. Cancionero de Palacio. Ensemble Gilles Binchois. Dominique Vellard. Virgin Veritas 45359.
- 1996 – [FAG] All the King's Men. Henry VIII & the Princes of the Renaissance. I Fagiolini. Robert Hollingworth. Concordia. Mark Levy. Metronome 1012.
- 1996 – [PIF] Los Ministriles. Spanish Renaissance Wind Music. Piffaro Renaissance Band. Joan Kimball, Robert Wiemken. Archiv 453 441.
- 1996 – [RES] Resonanzen '96. Musik aus den Habsburgerlanden. Varios grupos. ORF "Edition Alte Musik" CD 091 (2 Cds).
- 1997 – [RIC] A Ricolta Bubu – Medieval and Renaissance Music. Bob, Frank en Zussen. Pavane ADW 7391.
- 1998 – [MIN] Court and Cathedral. The two worlds of Francisco de Peñalosa. Concentus Musicus Minnesota. Arthur Maud (composer). Meridian 84406.
- 1998 – [JOU] Sephardic Journey. Spain and the Spanish Jews. La Rondinella. Dorian DOR 93 171.
- 1998 – [FIC] De Antequara sale un moro. Musique de l'Espagne chrétienne, maure et juive vers 1492. Ensemble Música Ficta. Carlos Serrano. Jade 74 321 79256-2.
- 1998 – [BEG] Cartas al Rey Moro. Begoña Olavide. Jubal JMPA 001.
- 1998 – [UFF] Música no tempo das Caravelas. Música Antiga da UFF.
- 1999 – [VIR] Bella de vos som amorós. La Música en la Corte de los Reyes Católicos y Carlos I. Capella Virelai. Jordi Reguant. La mà de guido 2035.
- 1999 – [SAV] La Folia, 1490–1701. Corelli, Marais, Martín y Coll, Ortiz, & Anónimos. Jordi Savall et al. Alia Vox AV 9805 (CD). Alia Vox AVSA 9805 (SACD-H).
- 1999 – [UMB] Chacona. Renaissance Spain in the Age of Empire. Ex Umbris. Dorian 93207.
- 2000 – [DIF] Diferencias – A Journey through Al-Andalus and Hispania. Codex Huelgas – Villancicos. Ensemble Diferencias. Conrad Steinmann. Divox Antiqua CDX-79809.
- 2000 – [OAK]' Piva. Renaissance Song of Italy and Spain. Duo LiveOak. Gyre Music 10032.
- 2000 – [MAG] Plaser y gasajo. Música cortesana en tiempos del Papa Alejandro VI. Capella de Ministrers. Carles Magraner. Auvidis Ibèrica (Naïve) AVI 8027.
- 2000 – [CAT] Carlos V. Mille Regretz: La Canción del Emperador. La Capella Reial de Catalunya y Hespèrion XXI. Jordi Savall. Alia Vox AV 9814 (CD). Alia Vox AVSA 9814 (SACD-H).
- 2000 – [SPI] Pilgerwege. Freiburger Spielleyt. Verlag der Spielleute CD 0003.
- 2000 – [MAY] Nunca fue pena mayor. Música Religiosa en torno al Papa Alejandro VI. Capella de Ministrers y Cor de la Generalitat Valenciana. Carles Magraner. Auvidis Ibèrica (Naïve) AVI 8026.
- 2001 – [CON] Constantinople. Musique du Moyen Âge et de la Renaissance. Kiya Tabassian & Ensemble Constantinople. ATMA ACD2 2269.
- 2001 – [GUI] Cançoner del duc de Calàbria. Duos i Exercicis sobre els vuit tons. In Canto. La mà de guido 2043.
- 2001 – [TER] ¡Baylado!. Music of Renaissance Spain. The Terra Nova Consort. Dorian 90298.
- 2001 – [ORL] Bread, Wine & Song. Music & Feasting in Renaissance Europe. Orlando Consort. Harmonia Mundi HMU 90 7314.
- 2002 – [OLA] A las puertas de Granada. Begoña Olavide. Mudéjar. Jubal JMPA 005.
- 2002 – [DUF] Cancionero. Music for the Spanish Court 1470–1520. The Dufay Collective. Avie AV0005.
- 2002 – [WIM] Misteris de Dolor. Cantos sacros de Catalunya y Polifonía instrumental española – s. XVI-XVII. Accentus Austria. Thomas Wimmer. Pneuma PN-410.
- 2003 – [PAN] La Conquista de Granada – Isabel la Católica. Las Cortes europeas, los Cancioneros y Musica Andalusi Nazari. Música Antigua. Eduardo Paniagua. Pneuma PN-660.
- 2003 – [NOT] El Fuego. Musique polyphonique profane di Siècle d'Or. Música de la Corte. Eduardo Notrica. Voice of Lyrics VOL BL 703
- 2004 – [CAP] Isabel I, Reina de Castilla. Luces y Sombras en el tiempo de la primera gran Reina del Renacimiento 1451–1504. La Capella Reial de Catalunya & Hespèrion XXI. Jordi Savall. Alia Vox AV 9838 (CD). Alia Vox AVSA 9838 (SACD-H).
- 2004 – [CDM] Cancionero de Palacio. Capella de Ministrers. Carles Magraner. Licanus CDM 0409.
- 2005 – [MAP] Música cortesana en la Europa de Juana I de Castilla 1479–1555. Las Cortes europeas y los Cancioneros. Musica Antigua. Eduardo Paniagua. Pneuma PN-710.
- 2005 – [ROS] In Vino. Wine in music from the 15th and 16th centuries. La Rossignol. Tactus 400004.
- 2006 – [REI] Christophorus Columbus. Paraísos Perdidos. Hespèrion XXI. La Capella Reial de Catalunya. Jordi Savall. Alia Vox AVSA 9850 A+B (2 SACD-H).
- 2006 – [BOR] Borgia. Música religiosa en torno al papa Alejandro VI (1492–1503). Capella de Ministrers. Carles Magraner. Licanus CDM 0616.
- 2006 – [CIB] La Spagna. Felipe I El Hermoso. Mecenas de la música europea. Camerata Iberia. Juan Carlos de Mulder. Open Music BS 059 CD

== Bibliography ==
- Historia de la música española. Vol 2. Desde el Ars Nova hasta 1600. Samuel Rubio. Alianza Editorial. Madrid. 1983
- Commentaries by Josep Romeu y Figueras in the booklet of El cancionero de palacio: 1474–1516. J. Savall. Hespèrion XX.
- Barbieri, Francisco Asenjo. Cancionero musical de los siglos XV y XVI. Real Academia de las Bellas Artes de San Fernando. 1890
- Anglés, Higinio. La música en la corte de los Reyes Católicos, II, III, Polifonía profana: Cancionero Musical de Palacio (siglos XV-XVI), 2 vols. Monumentos de la Música Española, nos 5, 10. C.S.I.C. y Instituto Español de Musicología. Barcelona. 1947 y 1951.
- Historia de la Música en España e Hispanoamérica 2. De los Reyes Católicos a Felipe II. Maricarmen Gómez (ed.). Fondo de Cultura Económica. Madrid-México D.F., 2012. ISBN 978-84-375-0677-7
