= Cancionero de Segovia =

Manuscript containing Renaissance music

The Cancionero de Segovia or Cancionero Musical de Segovia (CMS) (Segovia Cathedral, Archivo Capitular, s.s. [antiguo18]), also known as Cancionero of the Segovia Cathedral, is a manuscript containing Renaissance music from the end of the 15th century and beginning of the 16th century. It contains a wide repertoire of works by mainly Spanish, French and Franco-Flemish composers. It is kept at the Segovia Cathedral Archives.

== The manuscript ==
The cancionero was compiled by the end of the reign of Isabel the Catholic, between 1499 and 1503. Afterwards it belonged to the Library of the Real Fortress of Segovia, from where it was transferred at an unknown date to the Segovia Cathedral. This was a fortunate move, because the Real Fortress was destroyed by a fire in 1862, along with its library and all things therein.

In 1922, the manuscript was found by Higinio Anglés in the Chapterhouse Archives of the Segovia Cathedral.

The codex contains 228 numbered folios of average size (291 mm x 215 mm), being the area written of 239 mm x 166 mm. Unlike other cancioneros of the period, it does not have a table of contents, neither are the works grouped by musical genre (romance, motet, etc.)

The cancionero is divided into two parts:

1. The first part, up to the folio 206, contains more than 150 works of the Franco-Flemish repertoire.
2. The second part, from folios 207 through 228, begins with an inscription that reads "Aquj comjensan las obras castellanas" (here begin the Castilian works). This part contains 40 works, 37 of which are in Spanish, two in Latin (Pange lingua and Ave, Rex noster) and one with no text.

== The works ==
The codex comprises 204 works in total, in five different languages (74 in Latin, 50 in French, 38 in Spanish, 34 in Flemish/Dutch and 8 in Italian). Of them, 97 are unica, i.e., only found in this source. So far, 27 composers have been identified, but the authorship of a few works remain anonymous. Following is a list of the known composers, with number of works in parentheses:

- Jacob Obrecht (31)
- Heinrich Isaac (21)
- Alexander Agricola (19)
- Loyset Compère (15)
- Juan de Anchieta (9)
- Johannes Tinctoris (7)
- Josquin des Prez (7)
- Antoine Brumel (6)
- Juan del Encina (6)
- Hayne van Ghizeghem (5)
- Francisco de la Torre (4)
- Matthaeus Pipelare (4)
- Petrus Elinc (4)
- Roelkin (3)
- Johannes Martini (3)
- Antoine Busnois (2)
- Johannes Wreede (2)
- Adam (2)
- Philippe Caron (1)
- Pedro de Lagarto (1)
- Alonso de Mondéjar (1)
- Juan Pérez de Gijón (1)
- Johannes Joye (1)
- Jacobus Barbireau (1)
- Marturia Prats (1)
- Johannes Ffarer (1)
- Alonso Pérez de Alba (1)

The Segovia songbook contains both sacred and secular works. Among the genres found in it, there are masses, motets, villancicos, chansons and instrumental pieces. Their complexity ranges from very simple to very difficult.

=== List of works ===
| No. | Title | Voices | Composer | Genre | Concordances | Recordings | Comments |
First part: Franco-Flemish works
| 1 | Misa Wol auff gesell von hynnen | 3-6 | Heinrich Isaac | | | | incomplete |
| 2 | Misa L'homme arme sexti toni | 4 | Josquin des Prez | | | | |
| 3 | Misa Libenter gloriabor | 4 | Jacob Obrecht | | | | |
| 4 | Misa Adieu mes amours | 4 | Jacob Obrecht | | | | |
| 5 | Misa Rose playsante | 4 | Jacob Obrecht | | | | |
| 6 | Misa Fortuna desperata | 4 | Jacob Obrecht | | | | lacks an Agnus Dei |
| 7 | Misa Quant j'ay au cor | 4 | Heinrich Isaac | | Q18, I27, 757, HAR(3v) | | |
| 8 | Misa Sine nomine | 4 | Matthaeus Pipelare | | | | |
| 9 | Patrem omnipotentem (Misa Beata Virgine) | 4 | Juan de Anchieta | | | | |
| 10 | Salve Regina (Ad te clamamus / Eya ergo / O clemens) | 4 | Heinrich Isaac | | | | |
| 11 | Salve Regina (Vita dulcedo / Benedictum fructum) | 4 | Jacob Obrecht | | Q18 | | |
| 12 | Magnificat (quarti toni) | 4 | Alexander Agricola (Antoine Brumel?) | | | | |
| 13 | Magnificat | 4 | Josquin des Prez | | | AGO | |
| 14 | Inter praeclarissimas virtutes | 4 | Jacob Obrecht | | | | |
| 15 | Mille quingentis ("Requiem") | 4 | Jacob Obrecht | | | | |
| 16 | Ave maria... Virgo serena | 4 | Josquin des Prez | | | ODH | |
| 17 | O intemerata Virgo | 4 | Josquin des Prez | | | | |
| 18 | Salve virgo sanctissima | 4 | Heinrich Isaac | | | | |
| 19 | Omnis spiritus laudet | 5 | Jacob Obrecht | motet | | DAE | |
| 20 | Benedicamus in laude Jhesu | 4 | Jacob Obrecht | | | | |
| 21 | Exortum est in tenebris | 4 | Matthaeus Pipelare | | | | = Fors seulement |
| 22 | Cuius sacrata viscera | 4 | Jacob Obrecht | | | | |
| 23 | Domine non secundum peccata | 4 | Johannes Ffarer | | | AGO | |
| 24 | Ave, regina celorum | 4 | Heinrich Isaac | | | | |
| 25 | Domini Jhesu Christe qui hora Dei | 4 | Juan de Anchieta | | | | |
| 26 | Virgo et mater | 4 | Juan de Anchieta | | | PEÑ | |
| 27 | In passione Domini | 4 | Juan de Anchieta | | | ODH | |
| 28 | Domine, ne memineris | 4 | Juan de Anchieta | | | AGO | |
| 29 | Kyrie eleyson... Qui expansis | 4 | Anonymous | | | | |
| 30 | Veni, Sancte Spiritus / Veni Creator Spiritus | 4 | Alonso Pérez de Alba | | | ODH | |
| 31 | O crux ave, spes unica | 4 | Anonymous | | | | |
| 32 | Kyrie eleyson... qui passurus | 4 | Anonymous | | | | |
| 33 | O bone Jhesu | 4 | Juan de Anchieta (Loyset Compère?) | motet | CML | MUN, CAB | |
| 34 | Te Dominum confitemur | 4 | Anonymous | | | | |
| 35 | Juste judex Jhesu Christe | 4 | Anonymous | | | AGO | |
| 36 | Tmeiskin was jonc wel van passe | 4 | Jacob Obrecht | | Q17, HAR | | = De tusche in busche |
| 37 | Sullen wij langhe in drucke moeten leven | 4 | Jacob Obrecht | | | | |
| 38 | Sancte Michael, ora pro nobis | | Loysette Compere | | | | incomplete |
| 39 | J'ay priis amours | 4 | Johannes Martini (Antoine Busnois?) | | HAR | | |
| 40 | Fortuna vincineta | | Anonymous | | | | incomplete |
| 41 | Je ne demande | 4 | Antoine Busnois | | PIX, Q18, HAR | | |
| 42 | Je n'ay deul | 4 | Alexander Agricola | | Q17, 178, I27, 757, HAR | ORL | |
| 43 | Elaes (que pourra devenir) | 4 | Philippe Caron | | PIX, Q16(3v), Q18, I27(3v), 757(3v), HAR | | |
| 44 | Fortuna desperata | 5 | Heinrich Isaac | chanson | | DAE, AGO | |
| 45 | Le souvenir | 4 | Johannes Tinctoris | | | | |
| 46 | Fortuna desperata / Sancte Petre / Ora pro nobis | 5 | Heinrich Isaac | | | | |
| 47 | J'ay priis amours | | Heinrich Isaac | | 178 | | incomplete |
| 48 | Morkin ic hebbe ter scolen gheleghen | 4 | Matthaeus Pipelare | | | | |
| 49 | Laet u ghenoughen liever | 4 | Jacob Obrecht | | | | |
| 50 | Wat willen wij metten budel spelen, ons ghelt es uut | | Jacob Obrecht | | I27 | | |
| 51 | Tsaat een eleen meisken al up een blocskin | 4 | Jacob Obrecht | | HAR | | |
| 52 | Waer sij dij han / Wie roupt ons daer | 4 | Jacob Obrecht | | | | |
| 53 | Lacen adieu wel zoete plye | 4 | Jacob Obrecht | | | | |
| 54 | Zart reyne vrucht | 4 | Roelkin | | | | |
| 55 | Den Haghel ende die calde snee | 4 | Jacob Obrecht | | | | |
| 56 | Veci la dancha barberi | 4 | Loyset Compère | | | | |
| 57 | Weet ghij wat mynder jonghen herten deert | 4 | Jacob Obrecht | | | | |
| 58 | Mon pere m'a done (donné) mari | 4 | Loyset Compère | | | | |
| 59 | Vergironette (Bergerette) savosienne | 4 | Josquin des Prez | | HAR | | |
| 60 | Ic hoerde de clocskins luden | 4 | Jacob Obrecht | | | | |
| 61 | Als al de weerelt in vruch den leeft | 4 | Jacob Obrecht | | | | |
| 62 | Ic draghe de mutse clutse | 4 | Jacob Obrecht | | | | |
| 63 | I[c e]n hebbe ghen ghelt in myn bewelt | 4 | Jacob Obrecht | | | | |
| 64 | Ic weinsche alle scoene vrauwen eere | 4 | Jacob Obrecht | | | | |
| 65 | Meiskin es u cutkin ra | 4 | Jacob Obrecht | | 178, HAR | | |
| 66 | Misa (sine nomine) | 3 | Alexander Agricola (Aulen?) | | | | |
| 67 | Magnificat | 3 | Antoine Brumel | | | | |
| 68 | Magnificat | 3 | Juan de Anchieta | | | | |
| 69 | Salve sancta facies nostra redemptoris | 3 | Anonymous | | | | |
| 70 | Imperatrix reginarum | 3 | Anonymous | | | AGO | |
| 71 | Osanna salvifica tuum plasma | 3 | Anonymous | | | | |
| 72 | Alleluya | 3 | Anonymous | | | | |
| 73 | Alleluya, Salve virgo mater dei | 3 | Anonymous | | | AGO | |
| 74 | Aleph. Quomodo obscuratum est / Beth. Filii Syon | 3 | Anonymous | | | | |
| 75 | Aleph. Vie Syon lugent / Facti sunt hostes | 3 | Anonymous | | | | |
| 76 | Ave, verum corpus Domini | 3 | Anonymous | | | AGO | |
| 77 | Ave, ancilla trinitatis | 3 | Antoine Brumel | | | | |
| 78 | Mater patris et filia mulieris | 3 | Antoine Brumel | | Q18, HAR | ORL | |
| 79 | Ave, maris stella | 3 | Jacob Obrecht | | | AGO | |
| 80 | Dat ic myn lijden aldus helen moet | 3 | Petrus Elinc | | Q17 | | |
| 81 | In meinen zin | 3 | Alexander Agricola | | 178 | | |
| 82 | D'ung aultre amer | 3 | Alexander Agricola | | | AGO | |
| 83 | Oblier suis | 3 | Alexander Agricola | | Q17 | | |
| 84 | Vrucht ende moet es gar da hin | 3 | Roelkin | | | | |
| 85 | Vergironette (Bergerette) savosienne | 3 | Loyset Compère | | | AGO | |
| 86 | Tandernaken al up den Rijn | 3 | Alexander Agricola | | | | |
| 87 | Soyt loyng ou pres | 3 | Alexander Agricola | | Q17, I27 | | |
| 88 | Che nest pas jeu | 3 | Hayne van Ghizeghem (Johannes Ockeghem?) | | I27 | | |
| 89 | Aletz regretz | 3 | Hayne van Ghizeghem | | Q17, 178, 235, I27, 757, HAR | | |
| 90 | Mon souvenir | 3 | Hayne van Ghizeghem | | Q17, 178, 235, I27, HAR | | |
| 91 | Adieu natuerlic leven myn | 3 | Petrus Elinc | | | AGO | |
| 92 | Moet my lacen u vriendlic schiin | 3 | Jacob Obrecht | | | AGO* | |
| 93 | Verlanghen ghij doet mynder herten piin | 3 | Petrus Elinc | | | | |
| 94 | Een vroylic wesen | 3 | Jacobus Barbireau | | I27 | | |
| 95 | Mijn Alder liefste moeselkin | 3 | Alexander Agricola | | | AGO* | |
| 96 | Cuius sacrata viscera | 3 | Jacob Obrecht | | | | |
| 97 | Gracias refero tibi, Domine Jesu Christe | 3 | Heinrich Isaac | | | | |
| 98 | Santa Maria, ora pro nobis | 3 | Anonymous | | | | |
| 99 | Domine non secundum peccata nostra | 3 | Juan de Anchieta | | | AGO | |
| 100 | Conditor alme siderum | 3 | Juan de Anchieta | | | AGO | |
| 101 | Conditor alme siderum | 3 | Marturia Prats | | | | |
| 102 | Ave, sanctissima Maria mater Dei | 3 | Anonymous | | | AGO | |
| 103 | Si dedero | 3 | Alexander Agricola | | Q16, Q17, Q18, 178, 235, I27, 757, HAR | ORL | |
| 104 | Criste, si dedero | 3 | Jacob Obrecht | | | | = Christe from Missa Si dedero |
| 105 | In pace in idipsum | 3 | Josquin des Prez | | Q17, 178, I27 | | contrafactum of Que vous madame |
| 106 | Ortus de celo flos est (La stangetta) | 3 | Heinrich Isaac (Jacob Obrecht, or Weerbeke?) | | HAR | | |
| 107 | O intemerata | 3 | Johannes Martini | | | | |
| 108 | Hoert hier myn lieve gheselle | 3 | Petrus Elinc | | | | |
| 109 | De tous biens playne | 3 | Alexander Agricola | | HAR | | |
| 110 | Fortuna desperata | 3 | Antoine Busnois | | 431 | DAE, SCH | |
| 111 | O venus bant | 3 | Alexander Agricola | | | | |
| 112 | Princesse de toute beaulte | 3 | Alexander Agricola | | | | |
| 113 | Elaes | 3 | Heinrich Isaac | | Q18, 178, I27, 757, HAR | | =La Morra; Donna gentile |
| 114 | Ave, crux, spes unica | 3 | Antoine Brumel | | | | |
| 115 | De tous biens playne / Et qui la dira | 2 | Heinrich Isaac | quodlibet | | DAE, SCH | |
| 116 | Elaes | 3 | Heinrich Isaac | | 757, HAR | | |
| 117 | Mijns liefskins bruyn oghen | 3 | Matthaeus Pipelare | | | | |
| 118 | Reveille toy franc cuer | 3 | Loyset Compère | | | | |
| 119 | Adieu comment joye | 3 | Adam | | | | |
| 120 | Si j'ai parle aucunement | 3 | Loyset Compère | | Q17 | | |
| 121 | Vostre amour | 3 | Heinrich Isaac | | 178 | | = Christe from Missa Chargé de deul |
| 122 | Jamays | 3 | Antoine Brumel | | | | = Gracieuse gente meuniere |
| 123 | Vive el noble rey | 3 | Loyset Compère | | | | |
| 124 | De tous biens playne | 3 | Alexander Agricola | | | | |
| 125 | Je ne fays plus | 3 | Loyset Compère | | PIX, Q17, 176, 178, 235, I27, HAR | | |
| 126 | J'ay bieau huwert | 3 | Loyset Compère | | Q16, 178, 757, HAR | | |
| 127 | Fortuna desperata | 3 | Josquin des Prez | | | AGO, SCH | |
| 128 | Het es al ghedaen | 3 | Heinrich Isaac | | | | |
| 129 | Amours, Amours | 3 | Hayne van Ghizeghem | | PIX, 431, I27, HAR(4v) | | |
| 130 | Elaes Abrayam | 3 | Loyset Compère | | HAR | | = Helas le bon temps |
| 131 | Puis que | 3 | Loyset Compère | | Q16 | | |
| 132 | Cayphas | 3 | Loyset Compère (Johannes Martini?) | | | | |
| 133 | En attendant | 3 | Loyset Compère | | Q18, 178 | | |
| 134 | My my | 3 | Heinrich Isaac | | | | |
| 135 | Penser en vous | 3 | Hayne van Ghizeghem | | | | |
| 136 | Pour vostre amour | 3 | Antoine Brumel | | I27 | | = Digan a les donzelles by Heinrich Isaac |
| 137 | Nec michi nec tibi | 3 | Jacob Obrecht | | 431, I27 | | |
| 138 | O venus bant | 3 | Alexander Agricola | | 178, I27 | | |
| 139 | J'ay bien nori | 3 | Johannes Joye (J. Japart?) | | 178, I27 | | = Ja bien rise tans |
| 140 | Scoent kint | 3 | Johannes Martini | | | | = Fuga la morie |
| 141 | Beaulte damours | 3 | Loyset Compère | | | | |
| 142 | Comt hier | 3 | Heinrich Isaac | | | | = Pour mieulx valoir by F. Rubinet |
| 143 | Moyses | 3 | Heinrich Isaac (J. Barle?) | | | | = Kyrie from the anonymous mass No 7 in E-Bbc 454 |
| 144 | Garisse moy | 3 | Loyset Compère | | Q18, HAR | | |
| 145 | Je ne fays plus | 3 | Loyset Compère | | 178 | | |
| 146 | Gentile spiritus | 3 | Heinrich Isaac | | | | |
| 147 | Elaes | 3 | Alexander Agricola | | | | = Helas madame que feraige |
| 148 | De tous biens playne | 3 | Alexander Agricola | | | | |
| 149 | Cecus non judicat de coloribus | 3 | Ferdinandus et frater eius | | Q17 | | = Ave ancilla trinitas by Heinrich Isaac |
| 150 | La martinella | 3 | Heinrich Isaac | | | | |
| 151 | Morte que fay | 3 | Heinrich Isaac | canzona | 431(4v) | DAE | |
| 152 | Gaudeamus omnes in Domino | 2 | Alexander Agricola | | | | |
| 153 | Regina celi | 2 | Jacob Obrecht | | | | |
| 154 | De tous biens playne | | Adam | | | | |
| 155 | Comme femme desconforté | 2 | Alexander Agricola | | | | |
| 156 | De tous biens playne | 2 | Johannes Tinctoris | | | DAE | |
| 157 | De tous biens playne | | Roelkin | | M36 | SCH | |
| 158 | Le souvenir | 2 | Johannes Tinctoris | | | | |
| 159 | D'ung aultre amer | 2 | Johannes Tinctoris | | M36 | | |
| 160 | [Aleluya] | 2 | Johannes Tinctoris | | M36 | | no text |
| 161 | Tout a par moy | 2 | Johannes Tinctoris | | | | |
| 162 | Fecit potentiam (secundi toni) | | Anonymous | | | | |
| 163 | Comme femme | | Johannes Tinctoris | | | | |
Second part: Castilian works
| 164 | Justa fue mi perdición | 3 | Francisco de la Torre | villancico | CMP | ZIR, ORL, DAE, PAN | |
| 165 | Gran gasajo siento yo | 4 | Juan del Encina | villancico de égloga | CMP | ANT | |
| 166 | Pues jamás olvidaros | 4 | Juan del Encina | canción | CMP, FRO, DEF | ANT, PAL, ACC, CAP | |
| 167 | Nunca fue pena mayor | 3 | Johannes Wreede (Juan de Urrede) | | CMP, CMC, PIX, 831, Q16(4v), Q17, Q18, 176, 178, 235, 431, I27, 757, HAR(4v) | MAG, COL, EGB, HIL, WAV | text by García Álvarez de Toledo y Enríquez |
| 168 | Al dolor de mi cuidado | 3 | Juan Pérez de Gijón | | CMP, CMC | | |
| 169 | Romerico tu que vienes | 3 | Juan del Encina | villancico a diálogo | CMP, CME | ANT, VAL, BER, COM, ALT, SPI, DAE, UFF | |
| 170 | O que chapado plazer | 3 | Anonymous | | | | |
| 171 | Damos gracias a ti Dios | 3 | Francisco de la Torre | romance | CMP | ZIR, FIC, VIC | |
| 172 | Peligroso pensamiento | 3 | Francisco de la Torre | villancico | CMP | ZIR, EGB | |
| 173 | Dezi, flor resplandeçiente | 3 | Anonymous | | | HEN | |
| 174 | Contento soy que dolais dolor | 3 | Anonymous | | | | |
| 175 | Al del hato ça los angeles | 3 | Anonymous | | | | |
| 176 | Ya no quiero tener fe, señora | 3 | Juan del Encina | villancico | CMP | ANT, MAY, DAE, MAG | |
| 177 | El descanso de vos ver | 3 | Anonymous | | | | |
| 178 | Amor quiso que os quisiese | 3 | Anonymous | | | | |
| 179 | Por muy dichoso se tenga | 3 | Juan del Encina | cantata | CMP | ANT | |
| 180 | Ay triste que vengo | 3 | Juan del Encina | villancico | | ANT, HES, ANG, EMC, KIN, LAN, RON, ACC, RIC, DUF, CDM | |
| 181 | Mas lo precio que mi Enrique | 3 | Anonymous | | CMP | | |
| 182 | No cesé hasta que os vi | 3 | Anonymous | | | | |
| 183 | Qual estávades anoche | 4 | Anonymous | | | | |
| 184 | Ya no quiero ser vaquero | 3 | Juan del Encina | villancico | CMP | ANT | |
| 185 | (No text) | 3 | Anonymous | | | | |
| 186 | Harto de tanta porfia | 3 | Anonymous | | CMP(4v) | CAR, PAL, GOT | |
| 187 | Oyga tu merced y crea | 3 | Anonymous | | CMP, CMC | | text by Juan de Mena |
| 188 | Adoramuste, Señor | 4 | Francisco de la Torre | seises dance | CMP | ZIR, ORL, PIF*, REN | |
| 189 | Andad pasiones andad | 3 | Pedro de Lagarto | | CMP, CMC | ORL | |
| 190 | O si vieras al moçuelo | 3 | Anonymous | | | | |
| 191 | Nuevas, nuevas de plazer | 3 | Anonymous | | | | |
| 192 | Nuevas, nuevas por tu fe | 3 | Anonymous | | | HEN | |
| 193 | Como nos liebas, amor | 3 | Anonymous | | | | |
| 194 | Quanto más lexos de ti | 4 | Anonymous | | | | |
| 195 | Quedóse do quedo yo | 3 | Anonymous | | | AGO | |
| 196 | Para verme con ventura | 3 | Juan del Encina | villancico | CMP, UPS | ANT, CAN, INC | |
| 197 | Con temor y con plazer | 3 | Anonymous | | | | |
| 198 | Vete amor busca do'stés | 3 | Anonymous | | | | |
| 199 | Desdichado fue nacer | 3 | Anonymous | | | | |
| 200 | Vos partiste, yo quedé | 3 | Anonymous | | | | |
| 201 | Subime a lo alto | 3 | Anonymous | | | | |
| 202 | Pange lingua | 4 | Johannes Wreede (Juan de Urrede) | motet | | DAE | |
| 203 | Ave, Rex noster | 4 | Alonso de Mondéjar | | | AGO, ORL, HIL | |
| 204 | Ne recorderis | | Anonymous | | | | incomplete |

(*) Instrumental version

=== Concordance with other musical sources ===
==== Manuscripts ====
- Q16 - Bologna, Civico Museo Bibliografico Musicale, MS Q16 (I-Bc Q 16)
- Q17 - Bologna, Civico Museo Bibliografico Musicale, MS Q17 (I-Bc Q 17)
- Q18 - Bologna, Civico Museo Bibliografico Musicale, MS Q18 (I-Bc Q 18)
- CME - Elvas, Biblioteca Municipal Publia Hortensia, Ms 11793 (Cancioneiro de Elvas) (P-Em 11793)
- 176 - Florence, Biblioteca Nazionale Centrale, Ms. Magl. XIX. 176 (I-Fn Magl.XIX 176)
- 178 - Florence, Biblioteca Nazionale Centrale, Ms. Magl. XIX. 178 (I-Fn Magl.XIX 178)
- 235 - Florence, Biblioteca Riccardiana, MS. 2356 (I-Fr 2356)
- CML - Lisbon, Biblioteca Nacional Colecçao Dr. Ivo Cruz, MS 60 (Cancioneiro de Lisboa) (P-Ln Res C.I.C. 60)
- CMP - Madrid, Biblioteca Real, MS II - 1335 (Cancionero de Palacio)
- 831 - Oxford, Bodleian Library, MS. Ashmole 831 (GB-Ob Ashmole 831)
- PIX - Paris, Bibliothèque Nationale, fonds française 15123 (Chansonnier Pixérécourt) (F-Pn 15123)
- M36 - Perugia, Biblioteca Comunale Augusta, Ms. 36 (I-PEc M 36)
- 431 - Perugia, Biblioteca Comunale Augusta, Ms. 431 (olim G20) (I-PEc 431)
- I27 - Rome, Biblioteca Apostolica Vaticana, C. G.XIII. 2 7 (Cappella Giulia Chansonnier) (V-CVbav CG XIII.27 ).
- CMC - Seville, Catedral Metropolitana, Biblioteca Capitular y Colombina, Ms. 7-I-28 (Cancionero de la Colombina) (E-S 7-I-28)
- 757 - Verona, Biblioteca Capitolare. MS 752 (I-VEcap 757)

==== Printed books ====
- HAR - Harmonice Musices Odhecaton. 1501. Ottaviano Petrucci. Venice
- FRO - Frottole [libro secondo, Naples, Caneto, 1516?] (Florence, Biblioteca Marucelliana)
- DEF - João IV de Portugal, Defensa de la música moderna (Lisbon, 1649)
- UPS - Villancicos de diversos autores. Jerónimo Scotto. Venice. 1556. (Cancionero de Upsala)

== Discography ==
- 1981 - [ANT] Obra Musical Completa de Juan del Enzina. Miguel Á. Tallante. Pro Mvsica Antiqva de Madrid and soloists. New edition (1990): MEC 1024 a 1027 CD
- ???? - [MAY] Mayrat. El Viaje del Agua. Grupo Odres. Saga WKPD-10/2035.
- 1960 - [ANG] Victoria de los Ángeles - Spanish Songs of the Renaissance. Victoria de los Ángeles. Ars Musicae de Barcelona. José María Lamaña. Also found in CD: Victoria de los Ángeles - Cantos de España. EMI Classics 7243 5 66 937 2 2 (4 CD).
- 1968 - [VIC] Songs of Andalusia. Victoria de los Ángeles. Ars Musicae de Barcelona. Enrique Gispert. Also found in CD: Victoria de los Ángeles - Cantos de España. EMI Classics 7243 5 66 937 2 2 (4 CD).
- 1970 - [EMC] Music of the Royal Courts of Europe 1150-1600. Early Music Consort of London. David Munrow. Re-issued in CD as: The Pleasures of the Royal Courts. Elektra Nonesuch 9 71326-2.
- 1971 - [VAL] El Camino de Santiago. Cantos de peregrinación. Escolanía y Capilla Musical de la Abadía del Valle de los Caídos. Leoncio Diéguez. Laurentino Saenz de Buruaga. Cuarteto y Grupo de Instrumentos Antiguos Renacimiento. Ramón Perales de la Cal. EMI (Odeón) 7243 5 67051 2 8.
- 1974 - [BER] Old Spanish Songs. Spanish songs from the Middle Ages and Renaissance. Teresa Berganza. Narciso Yepes. Also found in CD: Canciones españoles. Deutsche Grammophon 435 648-2.
- 1976 - [MUN] The Art of the Netherlands. Early Music Consort of London. David Munrow.
- 1984 - [COM] Romeros y Peregrinos. Grupo Universitario de Cámara de Compostela. Carlos Villanueva Abelairas. EMI Classics CB-067.
- 1985 - [REN] Mon Amy. Ensemble Renaissance. Al Segno as 2004 2.
- 1987 - [KIN] Music from the Spanish Kingdoms. Circa 1500 Ensemble. CRD 3447.
- 1988 - [RIC] Music from the time of Richard III. Yorks Waits. Saydisc CD-SDL 364.
- 1989 - [HEN] Sacred and Secular Music from six centuries. The Hilliard Ensemble. Hyperion Helios CDH 55148.
- 1990 - [ZIR] Francisco de la Torre. La Música en la Era del Descubrimiento. Volume 6. Taller Ziryab. Dial Discos.
- 1991 - [PAL] El Cancionero de Palacio, 1474-1516. Música en la corte de los Reyes Católicos. Hespèrion XX. Jordi Savall. Astrée (Naïve) ES 9943.
- 1991 - [HES] Juan del Encina: Romances y villancicos. Jordi Savall. Hespèrion XX. Astrée (Naïve) ES 9925.
- 1991 - [COL] El Cancionero de la Colombina, 1451-1506. Música en el tiempo de Cristóbal Colón. Hespèrion XX. Jordi Savall. Astrée (Naïve) ES 9954.
- 1991 - [DAE] El Cancionero de la Catedral de Segovia. Ensemble Daedalus. Roberto Festa. Accent ACC 9176.
- 1991 - [HIL] Spanish and Mexican Renaissance Vocal Music. Music in the Age of Columbus / Music in the New World. Hilliard Ensemble. EMI Reflexe 54341 (2 CD).
- 1992 - [WAV] 1492 - Music from the age of discovery. Waverly Consort. Michael Jaffee. EMI Reflexe 54506.
- 1993 - [ALT] In Gottes Namen fahren wir. Pilgerlieder aus Mittelalter und Renaissance. Odhecaton, Ensemble für alte Musik, Köln. FSM 97 208.
- 1993 - [GOT] The Voice in the Garden. Spanish Songs and Motets, 1480-1550. Gothic Voices. Christopher Page. Hyperion 66653.
- 1995 - [LAN] Landscapes. Three centuries of world music. David Bellugi et al. Frame 9506.
- 1995 - [RON] A Song of David. Music of the Sephardim and Renaissance Spain. La Rondinella. Dorian Discovery DIS-80130.
- 1995 - [CAN] Canciones, Romances, Sonetos. From Juan del Encina to Lope de Vega. La Colombina. Accent 95111.
- 1996 - [EGB] Sola m'ire. Cancionero de Palacio. Ensemble Gilles Binchois. Dominique Vellard. Virgin Veritas 45359.
- 1996 - [PIF] Los Ministriles. Spanish Renaissance Wind Music. Piffaro, The Renaissance Band. Archiv Produktion 474 232-2.
- 1996 - [ACC] Cancionero Musical de Palacio. Ensemble Accentus. Thomas Wimmer. Naxos 8.553536.
- 1998 - [FIC] De Antequara sale un moro. Musique de l'Espagne chrétienne, maure et juive vers 1492. Ensemble Música Ficta. Carlos Serrano. Jade 74 321 79256-2.
- 1998 - [UFF] Música no tempo das Caravelas. Música Antiga da UFF.
- 2000 - [SPI] Pilgerwege. Freiburger Spielleyt. Verlag der Spielleute CD 0003.
- 2000 - [CAR] Carlos V. Mille Regretz: La Canción del Emperador. La Capella Reial de Catalunya. Hespèrion XXI. Jordi Savall. Alia Vox AV 9814.
- 2000 - [PEÑ] Anchieta: Missa Sine Nomine / Salve Regina. Capilla Peñaflorida. Ministriles de Marsias. Josep Cabré. Naxos 8.555772.
- 2001 - [INC] Cançoner del duc de Calàbria. Duos i Exercicis sobre els vuit tons. In Canto. La mà de guido 2043.
- 2001 - [SCH] Amours amours amours. Lautenduos um 1500. Schröder, Young. Harmonia mundi HMC 90 5253.
- 2002 - [DUF] Cancionero. Music for the Spanish Court 1470-1520. The Dufay Collective. Avie AV0005.
- 2002 - [ORL] The Toledo Summit. The Orlando Consort. Harmonia Mundi HMU 907328.
- 2003 - [AGO] Cancionero de Segovia. Manuscrito Musical s.s. del Archivo de la Catedral. Coral Ágora de Segovia. (Información en coralagora.com)
- 2003 - [PAN] La Conquista de Granada - Isabel la Católica. Las Cortes europeas, los Cancioneros y Música Andalusí Nazarí. Música Antigua. Eduardo Paniagua. Pneuma PN-660.
- 2004 - [CAP] Isabel I, Reina de Castilla. Luces y Sombras en el tiempo de la primera gran Reina del Renacimiento 1451-1504. La Capella Reial de Catalunya y Hespèrion XXI. Jordi Savall. Alia Vox AV 9838 (CD). Alia Vox AVSA 9838 (SACD-H).
- 2004 - [CDM] Cancionero de Palacio. Capella de Ministrers. Carles Magraner. Licanus CDM 0409.
- 2005 - [CAB] Juan de Anchieta: Missa Rex Virginum - Motecta. Capilla Peñaflorida. Josep Cabré. K 617
- 2006 - [MAG] Borgia. Música religiosa en torno al papa Alejandro VI (1492-1503). Capella de Ministrers. Carles Magraner. Licanus CDM 0616.
- 2007 - [ODH] Peñalosa: Un Libro de Horas de Isabel La Católica. Odhecaton. Paolo Da Col. Bongiovanni 5623.
- 2011 - [MOR] GLOSAS: Embellished Renaissance Music. More Hispano. Vicente Parrilla. Carpe Diem CD-16285.

== Bibliography ==
- Historia de la música española. Vol 2. Desde el Ars Nova hasta 1600. Samuel Rubio. Alianza Editorial. Madrid. 1983
- de Lama de la Cruz, V. Cancionero Musical de la Catedral de Segovia. Junta de Castilla y León. Salamanca, 1994.
- Perales de la Cal, Ramón (ed.). Cancionero de la Catedral de Segovia. Ed. facsímil. Caja de Ahorros y Monte de Piedad de Segovia. Segovia, 1977
- Anglès, Higinio. La música en la corte de los Reyes Católicos, MME, i, 1941
- Anglès, Higinio. Un manuscrit inconnu avec polyphonie du XVe siècle conservé à la cathédrale de Ségovie, AcM, viii, 1936
- Sohns, Eduardo (ed.). Cancionero de la Catedral de Segovia - Obras castellanas (Eduardo Sohns, Buenos Aires, 1999)
- Sohns, Eduardo (ed.). Cancionero de la Catedral de Segovia - Dúos (Eduardo Sohns, Buenos Aires, 2002)
- Sohns, Eduardo (ed.). Cancionero de la Catedral de Segovia - De tous biens playne: siete versiones de una chanson (Eduardo Sohns, Buenos Aires, 1999)
- Baker, N.K. An Unnumbered Manuscript of Polyphony in the Archives of the Cathedral of Segovia: its Provenance and History. U. of Maryland, 1978
- González Cuenca, Joaquín. Cancionero de la catedral de Segovia. Textos poéticos castellanos. Museo de Ciudad Real, Ciudad Real, 1980.
