= Gonzalo de Baena =

Gonzalo de Baena (1476 - after 1540) was a Spanish composer. Born to Alonso de Baena, a vihuelist for Queen Isabella (not to be confused with the royal singer of the same name), Baena had two brothers. All three likely served in Isabella's court before moving to Portugal to serve in the court of Manoel I in 1508. Baena later had a musical son, Antonio, who served in the court of João III, alongside Gonzalo and his brother Francisco.

In 1536, Baena petitioned João III to print his keyboard manual, Arte nouamente inuentada pera aprender a tanger. This book is the earliest surviving book of keyboard music from the Iberian peninsula. It contains intabulations of works by Ockeghem, Compère, Agricola, Févin, Josquin, Peñalosa, Escobar, Anchieta, Basurto and Morales. Eight pieces are attributed to his Antonio and two items are by Gonzalo. It also contains instructions on reading tablature and playing clavichord. It is clearly a comprehensive instructional manual, as the pieces progress from two voices to four voices, adding complexity further into the book.

== Music ==
=== Hymns ===
- Ave maris stella

=== Motets ===
- Si dedero
