= Francisco de la Torre =

Spanish composer and musician of the Renaissance

Francisco de la Torre (c. 1460 – c. 1504) was a Spanish composer mainly active in the Kingdom of Naples. His hometown may have been Seville. His music can be found in La música en la corte de los Reyes Musulmanes, edited by H. Anglès (1947–51).

== Biography ==
Francisco served as a singer at the Seville Cathedral from at least 1464 until 1467, and probably remained connected with Seville until 1485, when he left with the Aragonese royal chapel, whose choir he had joined on 1 July 1483. He would have been back in Seville when the court returned there for a residence lasting from the end of 1490 until March 1491 (Ruiz Jiménez 2010, 219–20). He took an annual salary of 25,000 maravedís and served in the same capacity for seventeen years. On 15 July 1488 he was awarded a half-prebend from Ferdinand II (Stevenson 2001). In May 1488 La Torre presented the Seville Cathedral Chapter with a claim that he had already been appointed to a half-prebend left vacant by its previous holder, Alonso Martínez de San Vicente. The chapter, which routinely resisted appointing prebendaries to non-resident applicants, rejected La Torre's claim and bestowed the position on their own candidate, Juan de Alifón. La Torre appealed the decision and, a month later, his attorney, Bernal Muñoz, presented the royal letter confirming his appointment, which he was finally granted in 1491 (Ruiz Jiménez 2010, 220). He left the royal court at Naples in 1500 and became a curate at the Cathedral of Seville, where on 10 February 1503 he was given charge of the choirboys and received an increased salary (Stevenson 2001). From 1497 until early 1503 he served as interim master of the choirboys in the temporary absence of Alfonso Pérez de Alva, and during that time lived in the house in the parish of Santa Maria, near the royal forge behind the cathedral, which Pérez de Alva leased from the chapter for 5,000 maravedís per annum. He relinquished this position to Pérez de Alva later in 1503, but continued to hold his half-prebend until his death in late February 1507, probably from the plague (Ruiz Jiménez 2010, 220–21).

== Compositions ==
His surviving compositions include one courtly instrumental dance, a funeral responsory (Ne recorderis), an office of the dead, and ten villancicos (three sacred, seven secular). According to Robert Stevenson, his "funerary works, notably the motet Libera me, are of great beauty and expressiveness." Four of his secular villancicos may be classified as romances, having something in common with the Netherlandish composer Juan de Urrede active in Spain in the previous generation. One, Pascua d'Espíritu Sancto, was composed for the feast of Corpus Christi the day after the reconquista of Ronda on 1 June 1485. It is based on a portion of the verse account of the Granada War by Hernando de Ribera.

Ten of his compositions are included in the Palace Songbook collection. Including, notably, an instrumental dance Alta danza that uses the famous tenor La Spagna, whose choreography in other contexts is known.
