= Cancionero de Medinaceli =

Manuscript of Spanish music of the Renaissance

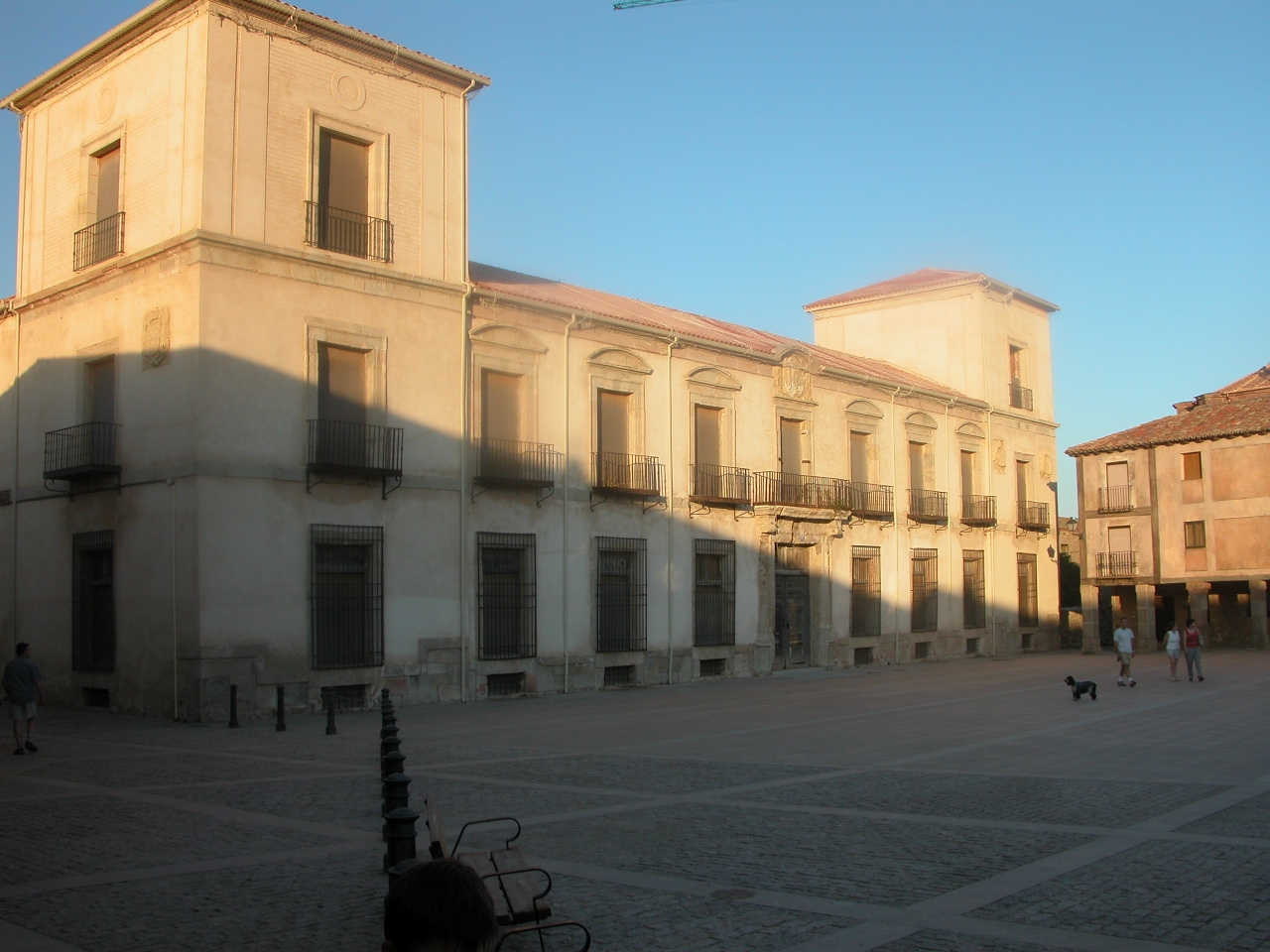
Duke of Medinaceli's Palace in Medinaceli

The Cancionero de Medinaceli or Cancionero Musical de Medinaceli (CMM) is a manuscript containing Spanish music of the Renaissance. It includes sacred and secular pieces. It is probably the most important compilation of Spanish secular polyphony of the Renaissance after the Cancionero de Palacio.

== History ==
The manuscript was copied during the second half of the 16th century. It is believed to have been copied in the south of Spain, and at some stage it was acquired by the Dukes of Medinaceli, hence its name. While in the ducal library, it was transcribed by Miguel Querol Gavalda. In the 1960s it was acquired by Bartolomé March Servera, a wealthy book collector.

== Recordings ==
Recordings include a 1992 album by Hespèrion XX El Cancionero De Medinaceli 1535-1595. It has been reissued by Astrée and Alia Vox.
