= Antonio de Ribera =

Antonio de Ribera (early 16th century) was a Spanish composer and singer during the Renaissance. Not much about his early life is known until he joined the papal chapel choir in 1514. He served there until at least 1526 and he may have died sometime between 1526 and 1529, as his name disappears from the record.

Two of the pieces attributed to him have conflicting attributions, being historically attributed to Peñalosa, Anchieta, and Compère. Some believe him to be the composer of the Elche Mystery Play, though there is no real evidence to support this.

== Music ==
=== Masses ===
- Misa, 4vv

=== Motets ===
- Ave Maria
- O bone Jhesu
- Patris sapientia

=== Villancicos ===
- Nunca yo, señora, os viera
- Por unos puertos arriva
