= Alonso Pérez de Alba =

Alonso Pérez de Alba (late 15th century or early 16th) was a Spanish composer during the Renaissance. There are several works attributed to Alonso de Alba, though his exact identity is unknown. There are two different people by the same name who could've composed these works.

One possibility is Alonso de Alva, maestro de capilla of the Seville Cathedral in 1503. This Alva died in 1504 and several polyphony books were found in his possession. Many of the works associated with Alonso de Alba are preserved with pieces by Francisco de Peñalosa and Pedro de Escobar. Both of these composers are closely related to the Seville Cathedral, giving this Alva some credibility.

Another possibility is Alonso de Alba, a member of the Castilian royal household. Much of the music attributed to Alba can be found in manuscripts of the Castilian royal chapels, giving some credence to this Alba. He was first recorded as chaplain and singer of Queen Isabella's chapel in 1497 until her death in 1504, when he retained the same position in the household of Juana 'the Mad'. He held several benefices; from 1501 he was Archdeacon of the Jaén Cathedral and from 1505 he was a canon of the Segovia Cathedral. He also accompanied Queen Isabella's catafalque to the Granada Cathedral. In these positions, he served alongside composers Pierre de la Rue and Juan de Ancieta.

All of the works attributed to Alonso de Alba are stylistically homogenous and are seemingly written by the same person. They were clearly influenced by Escobar and Anchieta, though Alba used imitation sparingly. His works were mostly homophonic and his liturgical pieces were mostly elaborations of existing plainchant, while his motets were more experimental.

== Music ==
=== Alleluias ===
- Alleluia, Angelus Domini
- Alleluia, Ascendo ad Patrem
- Alleluia, Assumpta est Maria
- Alleluia, Nativitas tua
- Alleluia, O adoranda Trinitas
- Alleluia, Vidimus stellam

=== Antiphons ===
- Ave Maria
- Vidi aquam

=== Hymns ===
- Beata nobis gaudia
- Christe, redemptor omnium
- Tibi Christe, splendor Patris
- Ut queant laxis
- Veni Creator Spiritus
- Vexilla Regis

=== Masses and Mass Movements ===
- Missa, 3vv
- Agnus Dei from Misa 'Rex virginum'

=== Motets ===
- O felix Maria
- O sacrum convivium
- Stabat mater
- Te ergo quaesumus

=== Villancicos ===
- No me digáis mal
