= Puy Manuscript =

The Puy Manuscript (French Le manuscrit du Puy) is an important musical manuscript of early church music from the Cathédrale Notre-Dame-de-l'Annonciation du Puy-en-Velay. The manuscript contains monodic and polyphonic chant and motets from the 12th to 16th centuries. The manuscript has been made widely known through the studies of Swiss musicologist Wulf Arlt and performances and recording led by Dominique Vellard.
