= Pedro de Lagarto =

Spanish singer and composer

Pedro de Lagarto (born circa 1465; died 1543 in Toledo) was a Spanish singer and composer of the Renaissance period.

Almost nothing is known about his early years, but a document dated 1537 affirms that he had been in the service of the Toledo Cathedral for 62 years. This suggests that he entered the cathedral in 1475 as a choirboy. In June 1490 he became master of the choirboys (claustrero), replacing Juan de Triana in the post. In 1495 he succeeded in obtaining a prebend as a singer in open contest; according to the rules, the winner would be the "most accomplished and fluent singer" among the contestants, and highly trained in polyphonic composition.

In 1507 he was seriously ill and does not seem to have resumed his duties as claustrero after this time. He held at least two chaplaincies at the cathedral and between 1530 and 1534 was maestro de ceremonias. By 1537, being deaf and blind, he asked to be relieved of his duties as chaplain; he died towards the end of 1543.

== Works ==
The only works by Lagarto that survived to our days were the ones included in one or more cancioneros of his time. Four works have been explicitly attributed to him in the Cancionero Musical de Palacio: (:

- Andad, pasiones, andad - villancico for 3vv
- Callen todas las galanas - villancico for 3vv
- D'aquel fraire flaco - villancico for 4vv
- Quéxome de ti, ventura - romance for 3vv

The villancicos draw on different themes: Andad, pasiones, andad is a love song also included in the Cancionero de la Colombina and in the Cancionero de Segovia; Callen todas las galanas compares the women of Toledo and Seville; and D'aquel fraire flaco is an anticlerical satire. The romance, Quéxome de ti, ventura, is a lament against the twists of Fortune. No sacred works in Latin have survived.

== Bibliography ==
- H. Anglès, ed.: La música en la corte de los reyes católicos: Cancionero musical de palacio (1947–51)
- F. Asenjo Barbiero, ed.: Cancionero musical de los siglos XV y XVI (Madrid, 1890/R), 22, 36–7
- M. Schneider: Gestaltimitation als Komposition-Prinzip im Cancionero de Palacio, Mf, xi (1958), 415–22
- G. Haberkamp: Die weltliche Vokalmusik in Spanien um 1500 (Tutzing, 1968), 186
- T. Knighton: Music and Musicians at the Court of Fernando of Aragon, 1474–1516 (diss., U. of Cambridge, 1984), i, 274
- E. Casares, ed.: Francisco Asenjo Barbieri: Biografías y documentos sobre música y músicos españoles, Legado Barbieri, i (Madrid, 1986), 275
- F. Reynaud: La polyphonie tolédane et son milieu: des premiers témoignages aux environs de 1600 (Paris, 1996), 102–6
