= Gabriel Mena =

Spanish poet, composer, musician and singer

Gabriel Mena (1470-1528) was a Spanish poet, composer, musician and singer. He was a servant of the Admiral of Castile, don Fadrique Enríquez and cantor of the chapel of Fernando el Católico until the king's death in 1516. He is first referenced in royal household accounts in 1496 and continued his work there until at least 1502. It is thought that after the king's death he entered into the service of Enríquez, Fernando's cousin, until he returned to serve the royal family in 1523. Here, he was in the employ of Juana "the Mad", where he remained until his death. A poem in the 1554 Cancionero general refers to him as a married man living close to Tordesillas in Torrelobatón. In fact, Mena was married twice with three children.

== Music ==
Mena was a respected poet and composer, with 19 musical works surviving. All but one of his works are preserved in the Cancionero Musical de Palacio, with the other being preserved in the records of the Biblioteca de Catalunya. Most of his songs are concerned with the hardship of love and contain quotes of other popular refrains. The songs Aquel pastorcico, madre, La bella malmarida, Aquella mora garrida, and Sola me dexastes all contain full quotations of the same refrain in the tenor.

Mena's music was very distinct, and surviving examples show some characteristics that were unique to him in the Spanish Renaissance era. First, he used rapid scalar passages in all of his voices. Second, while rarely changing meter, he frequently used polyrhythms that changed the felt meter of the passage. His closing chords never rose above E or C and he often used parallel first inversion chords. Additionally, his surviving compositions include no romances. Even his setting of the popular romance, La bella malmaridada, is not a romance, but a refrain. And finally, unlike his contemporaries Juan del Encina and Luis de Milán, he wrote music to be sung by a woman.

== Works ==
=== Villancicos ===
- Aquel pastorcico, madre
- Aquella mora garrida
- Andaran siempre mis ojos, 2vv
- Andaran siempre mis ojos, 3vv
- De la dulce mi enemiga
- La bella malmaridada
- Mi ventura, el caballero
- Sola me dexastes
