= Juan Pérez de Gijón =

Spanish composer

Juan Pérez de Gijón (fl. 1460 – 1500) was a Spanish composer of the Renaissance.

Nothing is known about his life, except for his approximate period of activity. He is one of the composers of secular songs who contributed to the huge Cancionero Musical de Palacio, the largest and most diverse manuscript collection of music from Spain at the time of Columbus. Most likely this manuscript was copied for King Ferdinand II of Aragon, and may represent his personal taste. In addition to the songs found in this manuscript, some songs attributed to Perez de Gijón are also in the Cancionero de la Colombina, a late 15th-century manuscript from Seville; this manuscript was part of the library of Ferdinand Columbus, the son of the explorer, by 1534.

Most of the secular songs in both manuscripts, including those by Perez de Gijón, are villancicos; most of them are for three voices, with the tune in the topmost voice.

== Sources and further reading ==
- "Spain: Art Music", Grove Music Online ed. L. Macy (Accessed January 21, 2005), Grove Music Online.
- Gustave Reese, Music in the Renaissance. New York, W.W. Norton & Co., 1954. ISBN 0-393-09530-4
