= Dominique Vellard =

French tenor and medievalist

Dominique Vellard (born 1953) is a French tenor and specialist in medieval music. In 1979 he founded the Ensemble Gilles Binchois, a leading ensemble in the performance of Ars Nova music. He is also a composer.

== Selected discography ==
Harmonic:

- Gregorian Chant. Ensemble Gilles Binchois - Dominique Vellard Harmonic 8827
- Les Escholiers de Paris - Motets, Chansons et Estampies du XIIIe siècle. Ensemble Gilles Binchois - Dominique Vellard Harmonic reissued Cantus Records:
- Machaut: Messe de Notre Dame
- Machaut: Le Jugement du Roi de Navarre Ballades, motets, virelais. Ensemble Gilles Binchois - Dominique Vellard Cantus

Virgin Veritas:

- Jehan de Lescurel: Fontaine de grace Ballades, virelais et rondeaux Ensemble Gilles Binchois - Dominique Vellard Virgin Veritas 45066
- Guillaume Dufay: Missa Ecce ancilla Domini Ensemble Gilles Binchois - Dominique Vellard Virgin Veritas 45050
- Le Banquet du Voeu 1454. Ensemble Gilles Binchois - Dominique Vellard Virgin Veritas 59043
- Le Manuscrit du Puy. Ensemble Gilles Binchois - Dominique Vellard Virgin Veritas 59238
- Les premiers polyphonies française. Ensemble Gilles Binchois - Dominique Vellard, dir. Virgin Veritas 45135
- El Misteri d'Elx. Ensemble Gilles Binchois - Dominique Vellard Virgin Veritas 45239 (2 CDs)
- Sola m'ire Cancionero de Palacio. Ensemble Gilles Binchois - Dominique Vellard Virgin Veritas 45359
- Gilles Binchois: chansons Mon souverain desir. Ensemble Gilles Binchois - Dominique Vellard Virgin Veritas 45285
- Pedro de Escobar: Requiem Ensemble Gilles Binchois - Dominique Vellard Virgin Veritas 45328
- Les trois Maries - Messe grégorienne de Pâques. Ensemble Gilles Binchois - Dominique Vellard Virgin Veritas 45398
- Amour, Amours Florilège des chansons françaises de la Renaissance Ensemble Gilles Binchois - Dominique Vellard Virgin Veritas 45458

Glossa Music:

- Music and Poetry in St Gallen - Sequences and tropes. Ensemble Gilles Binchois Dominique Vellard
- Motets croisés Monteverdi, Heinrich Schütz, Leguay, Frescobaldi. Dominique Vellard fr:Jean-Pierre Leguay
- L'Arbre de Jessé Gregorian chant and medieval polyphony. Ensemble Gilles Binchois Dominique Vellard
- Francisco de Peñalosa: Missa Nunca fué pena mayor. Les Sacqueboutiers Ensemble Gilles Binchois Dominique Vellard
- L'Amor de Lohn Medieval songs of love and loss. Ensemble Gilles Binchois Dominique Vellard
- Vellard: Vox nostra resonet New music for voices. Ensemble Gilles Binchois Dominique Vellard
- Trialogue - South Indian, Moroccan and European medieval traditions. fr:Aruna Saïram Noureddine Tahiri Dominique Vellard
- Indian Ragas and Medieval Song - Modal melodies from East to West. Dominique Vellard Ken Zuckerman Anindo Chatterjee Keyvan Chemirani

Other labels:

- Alexandre-Pierre-François Boëly (1785–1858) Temperaments
- Tientos Temperaments
- Palestrina DHM
- Manuscrit de Saint-Gall - Musique & Poésie du IXe siècle de Dominique Vellard SCB 1997
- Rodrigo de Ceballos Lamentations. Mass. Ensemble Gilles Binchois - Dominique Vellard Almaviva
- Pérotin and the school of Notre Dame, 1160-1245 Ensemble Gilles Binchois - Dominique Vellard Ambroisie 9947
- Cantigas de Santa Maria Ensemble Gilles Binchois Ambroisie 9973
