= Juan de Urrede =

Flemish singer and composer

Juan de Urrede (also Juan de Urreda, born c.1430 in Bruges as Johannes de Wreede, died after 1482 in Salamanca) was a Flemish singer and composer active in Spain in the service of the Duke of Alba, King Ferdinand and Queen Isabella.

== Life ==
His father was Rolandus de Wreede, organist at St Donatian. He was refused a clerkship at the same cathedral because a father and son were not allowed to work in the same institution. He served as a clerk at the church of Our Lady in Bruges from 1457 to 1460, when his name disappears from the record. It is believed that he left for Spain at this time. His name reappears in 1476, when he was paid in the service of the Duke of Alba's household. On 17 June 1477 he became a singer and maestro de capilla at the Aragonese royal chapel. During his service at the chapel, he applied for the Salamanca University professorship and petitioned for a change to their system of electing professors, but his requests and application were denied. Urrede's name vanishes after 1482 and it is not known if this is when he died, as the house records for the following years are lost.

== Music ==
His compositions are unique in that they blend Flemish traditions with new Spanish elements. He adopted the canción form and the chant tradition of Spain, but elements of the Franco-Burgundan school from his homeland are apparent in his writing. While he was not the only Spanish-Flemish composer at the time, he is certainly the most well-known, with many of his works influencing other Spanish Renaissance composers. In addition to Urrede, Johannes Cornago and Enrique de Paris, Spanish composers who were taught in the north, were instrumental in the spread of Flemish ideas throughout the Iberian Peninsula.

Urrede was certainly the most renowned Flemish composer in Spain during this time. Ramis de Pareia, professor at Bologna University, praised him as "carissimus noster regis Hispaniae capellae magister", or the dearest chapel master of the King of Spain. One of Ramis's students, Giovanni Spataro, also praised Urrede in his Tractato di musica. Spataro specifically praised his Benedictus of a Mass, which is now lost.

Some of Urrede's popular works are preserved in French, Italian, and Iberian sources. One such work is his canción Nunca fue pena mayor, a musical setting of a poem written by the Duke of Alba around 1470. This composition became the basis of works by many other composers, such as Pierre de La Rue and Francisco de Peñalosa, who both wrote a Missa 'Nunca fue pena mayor'. It was also sung in two plays by the poet Gil Vicente.

He composed several settings of the Pange Lingua Gloriosi Corporis Mysterium, mostly based on the original Mozarabic melody composed by St. Thomas Aquinas. One of his compositions for four voices was widely performed in the sixteenth century, and became the basis for a number of keyboard works and masses by Spanish composers. Although he wrote sacred songs, he was better known for courtly songs.

== Works ==
Urrede's music has been recorded and issued on media including:

Cancionero de Segovia: Pange Lingua

- El Cancionero de la Catedral de Segovia, The Segovia Cathedral Songbook, Ensemble Daedalus, Roberto Festa

Nunca fue pena mayor (Never was there greater sorrow). Chanson. c.1470 for instruments

- from the Cancionero de la Colombina 1460-1490
- from Harmonice Musices Odhecaton Ottaviano Petrucci Venice 1501
- from Canti C cento cinquanta Ottaviano Petrucci Venice 1504
- Ens Les Flamboyants. Rosa Dominguez voice, Viva Biancaluna Biffi fiddle, Jane Achtmann fiddle/viola d'arco, Irene Klein viola da gamba, Norihisa Sugawara lute/fiddle, Giovanna Pessi harp, Michael Form, Luis Beduschi, Gerit Kropfl recorders, Rogerio Goncalves percussion
- Zefiro Torna. Eufoda 1343
- Montserrat Figueras, Hesperion XX / Jordi Savall. Astree 9954
- Montserrat Figueras, Hesperion XX / Luiz Alves de Silva. Fontalis 8763
- Ferre, Binchois Ensemble / D.Vellard. EMI Virgin Classics 567-545359
- Hilliard Ensemble. EMI Virgin Classics 653-561394
- Waverly Consort / Jaffee. EMI Virgin Classics 621-561815
- Newberry Consort. Harmonia Mundi France 7907083
- Larry Hill, Gregory Tambornino. Meridian 84406
- Nancy Knowles, Frank Wallace. Centaur 2109

Donde estas que non te veo for voice and instruments from the Cancionero de la Colombina 1460-1490

- Montserrat Figueras s, Hesperion XX / Jordi Savall. Astree 9954

Muy triste sera mi vida from the Cancionero de la Colombina 1460-1490

- Hesperion XX / Jordi Savall. Astree 9954

De vos y de mi quejoso

Pange lingua
