= Alonso de Córdoba =

Spanish explorer (1505–1589)

Alonso de Córdoba Gómez (1505–1589) was a Spanish nobleman's son who sought his fortune in the Americas. He was born in Valdepeñas, Ciudad Real Province, Spain, and married Olalla of Merlo, also of Valdepeñas.

Córdoba arrived with his wife in Peru in 1534, and Chile in 1540 along with Pedro de Valdivia. He was made an encomendero over the indigenous population in Santiago, Chile and served as regidor of the city in 1548, 1568 and 1580. He was mayor of Santiago in 1559, 1562, and 1581. He purchased the rights and founded the Spanish settlement at El Quisco. He died in 1589 in Santiago.

An avenue in Vitacura is named after him.
