= Biblioteca Augusta =

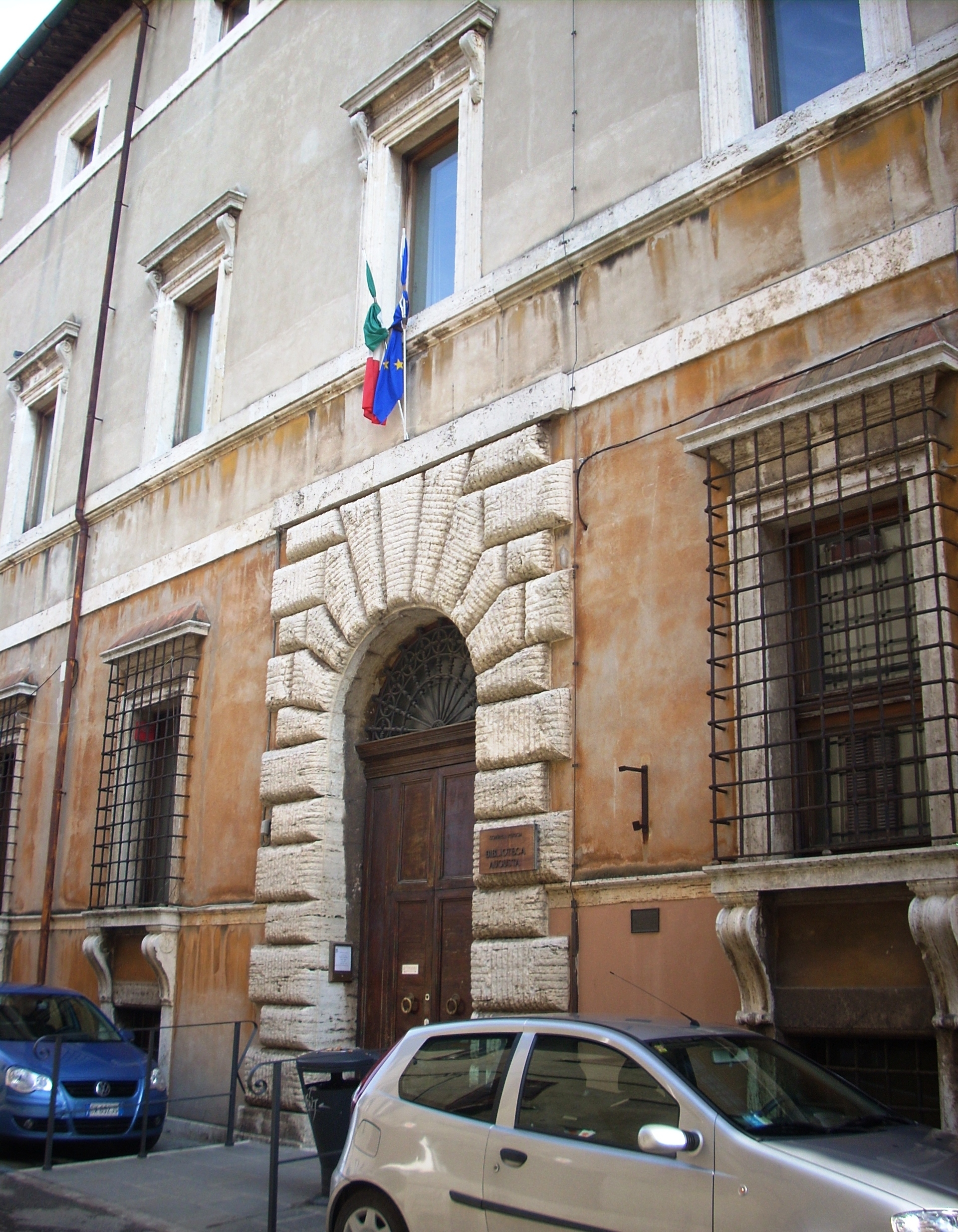
Entrance to the Biblioteca Augusta in Perugia, photographed c.2010

The Biblioteca Augusta (est. 1582) is a public library in Perugia, Italy, founded by Prospero Podiani. It opened in 1623, housed in the former Palazzo Meniconi on the Piazza Piccola. It currently operates from the Palazzo Conestabile della Staffa in the Porta Sole area of the city.

== Bibliography ==
=== in English ===
- Edward Edwards (1869), "Brief Notices of Collectors: Prosper Podiani", Free Town Libraries: Their Formation, Management, and History in Britain, France, Germany & America, New York: J. Wiley, OCLC 1385548
- Ennio Sandal (1990). "Endowed Municipal Public Libraries". Libraries & Culture. 25 (3: Libraries and Librarianship in Italy). USA: 358–371. JSTOR 25542275.
- Angela Nuovo (2010). "Private Libraries in Sixteenth-century Italy". In Bettina Wagner [in German]; Marcia Reed (eds.). Early Printed Books as Material Objects. IFLA Publications. Walter de Gruyter. ISBN 978-3-11-025324-5.
- Cristina Dondi; Maria Alessandra Panzanelli Fratoni (2016). "Researching the Origin of Perugia's Public Library (1582/1623) before and after Material Evidence in Incunabula". Quaerendo. 46 (2). Netherlands.

=== in Italian ===
- Maria Pecugi Fop (1974). "Gli incunaboli del Fondo Podiani nella Biblioteca Augusta". Bollettino della Deputazione di Storia Patria per l'Umbria (in Italian). 71.
- Giovanni Cecchini (1978). La Biblioteca Augusta del Comune di Perugia (in Italian). Rome: Edizioni di Storia e Letteratura.
- "Prospero Podiani", Dizionario Biografico degli Italiani (in Italian), 2015
