= Hespèrion XXI =

Musical ensemble

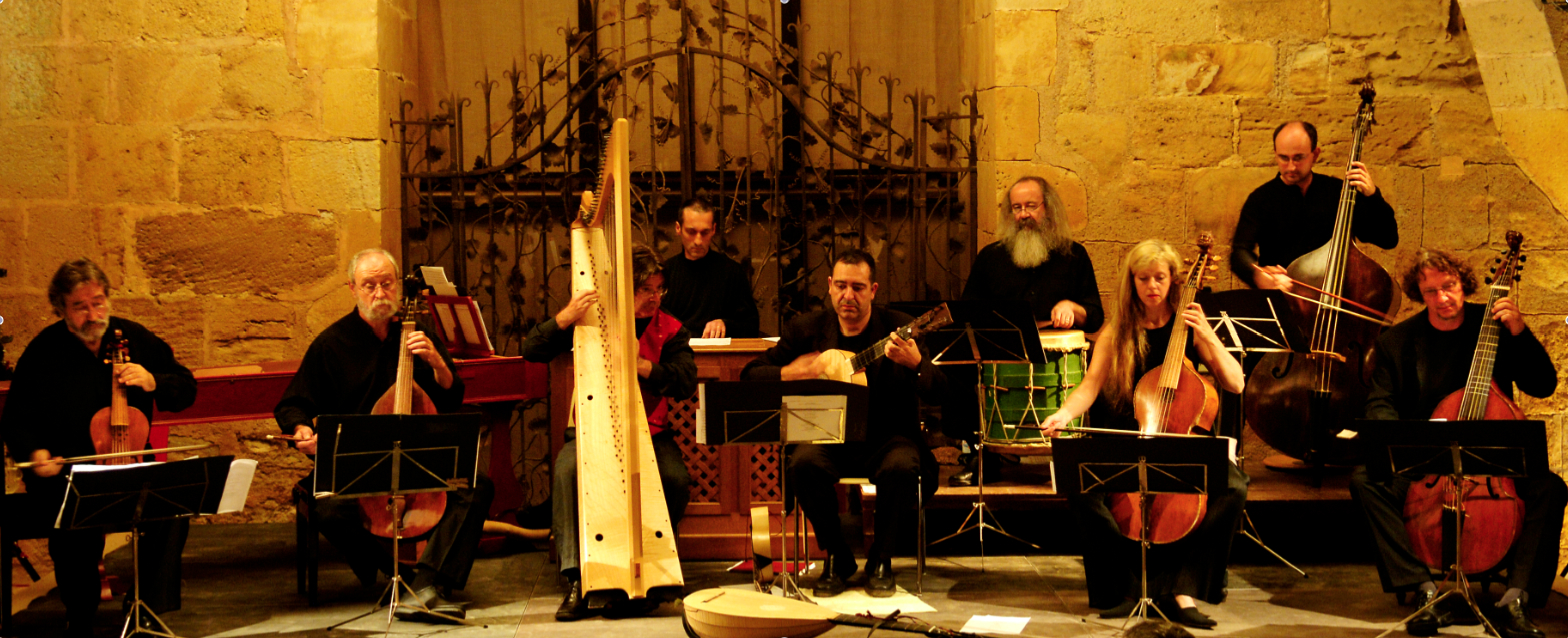
Hespèrion XXI's viol consort

Hespèrion XXI is an international early music ensemble. The group was formed in Basel, Switzerland in 1974 as Hespèrion XX by Catalan musical director Jordi Savall (bowed string instruments, particularly the viola da gamba), his wife Montserrat Figueras (soprano), Lorenzo Alpert (flute, percussion), and Hopkinson Smith (plucked string instruments). The group changed its name to Hespèrion XXI at the beginning of the 21st century. The name "Hespèrion" is derived from a word in Classical Greek which referred to the people of the Italian and Iberian peninsulas.

The ensemble is noted for its scholarship in early music, especially the music of 16th and 17th century of Spain. Their performance practice is noted for the liberal use of improvisation around the basic melodic and rhythmic structures of the early pieces, resulting in great emotional intimacy and immediacy.

== Awards ==
- Grand Prix de l'académie du Disque Français
- Edison-Prijs Amsterdam
- Grand Prix du Disque of the Charles Cros Academy of France
- Grand Prize of the Japanese Recording Academy
- Cannes Classic Award
- Diapason d'Or
- Grand Prix FNAC
- Giorgio Gini Foundation Prize

== Selected discography ==
=== As Hespèrion XX ===
Note: The name of composer Juan del Encina (or Enzina) is spelled below as printed on the individual CD covers.

- 1976 - Music from Christian and Jewish Spain, 1450-1550. Villancicos and romances from the cancioneros Colombina, Palacio, and Upsala; recercadas from the Trattado de Glossas; and sephardic romances from the Romancero.
- 1978 - "Cansós de Trobaritz". A recording of songs of Catalan Troubadours.
- 1979 - Llibre Vermell de Montserrat. A 14th century pilgrimage
- Feb. 1990 - consort music by Jenkins (Astrée Auvidis)
- 1991 - Juan Del Enzina: Romances & Villancicos, Salamanca, 1496. Works by Spanish composer Juan del Enzina honouring King Ferdinand II of Aragon and Queen Isabella of Castille. The lyrics express Spain's anticipated rise to greatness as adventurers, such as Columbus, set off to return the world's riches to the homeland, thereby assuring Spain's wealth and power.
- 1991 - Lope de Vega: Intermedios del Barroco Hispanico, 1580-1680
- 1993 - Matthew Locke, Consort of Fower Parts 1650-1660
- Oct. 1994 - consort music by Purcell (Astrée Auvidis)
- 1998 - Elizabethan Consort Music 1558 - 1603, Works by Alberti, Parsons, Strogers, Taverner, White, Woodcoock & Anonymes
- 1999 - El Barroco Hispánico
- 2001 - Music for the Spanish Kings
- 2001 - J. S. Bach: Die Kunst Der Fuge

=== As Hespèrion XXI ===
- 2000 - Diáspora Sefardí, Alia Vox — a recreation of music of the Eastern Sephardic communities
- 2002 - Ostinato, Alia Vox
- 2004 - Isabel I: Reina de Castilla, Alia Vox
- 2005 - Altre Follie, Alia Vox
- 2006 - Orient-Occident, Alia Vox
- 2008 - Estampies & Danses Royales: Le Manuscrit du Roi ca. 1270–1320, Alia Vox
- 2009 - The Book of the Science of Music by Dimitrie Cantemir, Alia Vox
- 2009 - Le Royaume Oublié: La croisade contre les Albigeois – La tragédie Cathare, Alia Vox
- 2011 - La Sublime Porte: Voix d'Istanbul, 1430–1750, Alia Vox
- 2013 - Esprit des Balkans, Alia Vox
- 2016 - GRANADA 1013 - 1502, Alia Vox
