= Waverly Consort =

The Waverly Consort was an American early music group led by Michael and Kay Jaffee. Michael Jaffee died on June 15, 2019.
