= Higinio Anglés =

Spanish priest and musicologist

Higinio Anglés Pamies (Catalan: Higini Anglès i Pàmies; 1 January 1888 – 8 December 1969) was a Spanish Catholic priest and musicologist. He was born in Maspujols, Tarragona, Spain, and died in Rome, Italy.

== Early life and education ==
Anglés studied in Reus and entered the seminary in Tarragona in 1900. He was ordained as a Catholic priest in 1912. After studying music in Barcelona under Felip Pedrell and other teachers, he was appointed head of the Music Department at the Library of Catalonia in 1917. He later continued his studies at the University of Freiburg and the University of Göttingen, where he studied with Wilibald Gurlitt, Friedrich Ludwig, and Heinrich Finke.

== Honours ==
- Spain : Grand Cross of the Order of Isabella the Catholic (06/01/1958)
