= Juan de Anchieta =

Basque composer (1462–1523)

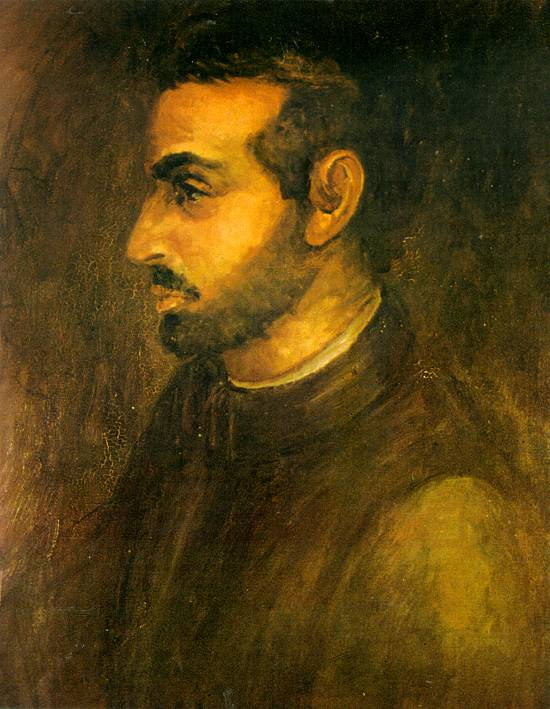

Background information
- Born: 1462; Azpeitia
- Died: 1523 (aged 60–61) Azpeitia
- Genres: Renaissance
- Occupations: Composer, Musician, Singer, Chaplain
- Years active: 1489–1519

Juan de Anchieta (1462 – 1523) was a leading Spanish Basque composer of the Renaissance, he served as a singer and chapel master in the royal court of the Catholic Monarchs and their successors. Anchieta was closely associated with Queen Isabella I of Castile, Prince John, Queen Joanna of Castile, and the future Emperor Charles V, for whom he acted as a music teacher.

== Biography ==
Juan de Anchieta was born in Azpeitia, in 1462 to a leading Basque family, his mother was a great-aunt of Ignatius of Loyola, founder of the Society of Jesus. He may have studied at Salamenca University with music professor Diego de Fermoselle, older brother of Juan del Encina.

He officially joined the royal chapel of Queen Isabella as a chaplain and singer on 6 February 1489. At the time of his appointment, he was approximately twenty-seven years old. His initial annual salary was 20,000 maravedís, which was calculated from the standard 8,000 maravedís for chaplains alongside an additional 12,000 maravedís allocated for lay singers. He experienced a rapid professional rise within the court. In August 1493, his salary was increased to 30,000 maravedís, an amount equivalent to that of the chief chaplain, even though Anchieta did not formally hold that title. In 1495, his career advanced further when he was transferred to serve as the maestro de capilla for Prince Don Juan. The Prince, who was fond of singing, would frequently summon Anchieta and several choir boys during summer siestas to sing together for hours.

Returning to the Queen's service after the Prince's death in 1497, and in 1504, to that of the new Queen, Joanna the Mad. In her service he travelled to Flanders with Pierre de La Rue, Alexander Agricola, and Marbrianus de Orto. He held various church benefices; from 1499 he was absentee benefice-holder at Villarino, from 1500 he was rector at the parish church of S Sebastián de Soreasu in Azpeitia, from 1518 he was Abbot of Arbós, a town located at the province of Tarragona, and a chaplain at Granada Cathedral, spending his final years in a Franciscan convent he had founded in Azpeitia. His nephew, García de Anchieta, was to be his successor at S Sebastián de Soreasu, but he was assassinated before he could take charge. Between 1507 and 1516, Anchieta served as Queen Joanna’s chaplain and singer, earning an annual salary of 45,000 maravedís.

His life was also marked by violent family conflicts. On 20 February 1515, two of the Loyola brothers, including Ignatius of Loyola assaulted Anchieta at his home. While Ignatius attempted to escape, he was captured and briefly jailed in Pamplona. Tragedy struck the family again in 1518 when Anchieta’s nephew and successor as rector, García de Anchieta, was assassinated shortly after his appointment.

The convent he founded came after King Charles V declared that Anchieta, aged 57, was too old for service at court, and gave him an annual retirement salary of 45,000 maravedís in 1519. In 1520 an official record described Anchieta as "ill in his house at Azpeitia", and in 1521 he transferred his income to the new foundation of Franciscan sisters. Now a business manager, the sisters promised him a sacred burial place in their church. However, contrary to his will, he was buried at S Sebastián de Soreasu.

== Sacred Music ==
A total of about thirty compositions by Juan de Anchieta have been preserved. Among these are four pieces with Spanish lyrics, several general sacred works, four attributed Passions, one Salve Regina, two Magnificats, and two complete Masses. Musically, his surviving Masses and motets are notable for their frequent use of plainsong and predominantly chordal textures.

He was among the leading Spanish composers of his generation, writing music for the ample resources of the court chapel of the Catholic Monarchs. He was not very progressive, but his compositions showcased mastery over the Spanish Renaissance style. His music was generally written for large choirs and included frequent imitation at the unison, fourth, fifth, and octave.

Anchieta might be the author of the motet Epitaphion Alexandri Agricolae symphonistae regis Castiliae (published in 1538), which contains important details of the Agricola's biography. The four Passion settings attributed to him, homophonic four-voice responsorials, are the first of their kind in Spain. One of his most popular pieces was Dos ánades, which was described by Francisco de Quevedo in 1626 as "frequently sung, though old fashioned".

== Works ==
=== Masses, mass movements and magnificats ===
- Missa quarti toni
- Missa Rex virginum
- Missa ‘Ea iudios a enfardelar’ (lost)
- Kyrie, 4vv
- Magnificat, 3vv
- Magnificat, 4vv

=== Passions ===
- Pasión según San Mateo
- Pasión según San Marcos
- Pasión según San Lucas
- Pasión según San Juan

=== Motets ===
- Ave sanctissima Maria
- Ave verum corpus
- Conditor alme siderum
- Domine Jesu Christe qui hora in diei ultima
- Domine, ne memineris
- Domine, non secundum peccata nostra
- In passione Domini
- Libera me, Domine
- Salve regina
- Salve sancta facies
- Salve sancta parents
- Sancta Mariai
- Virgo et mater
- O bone Jesu

=== Secular ===
- Con amores, la mi madre
- Donsella, madre de Dios
- Dos ánades
- En memoria d'Alixandre
