= Francisco de Peñalosa =

Spanish composer (c.1470–1528)

Francisco de Peñalosa (c. 1470 – April 1, 1528) was a Spanish composer of the middle Renaissance.

== Life ==
He was born in Talavera de la Reina in the province of Toledo. He spent most of his career in Seville, serving as the maestro di capilla, though he also spent time in Burgos, and three years in Rome at the papal chapel (1518–1521). He died in Seville.

== Music and influence ==
Peñalosa was one of the most famous Spanish composers of the generation before Cristóbal de Morales, and his compositions were highly regarded at the time. Unfortunately for him, his music was not widely distributed; he did not benefit from the invention of printing, since he mostly remained in Spain, away from cities such as Venice and Antwerp which were the first centers of printed music. Later generations of Spanish composers—Guerrero, Morales, Victoria—went to Italy for parts of their careers, where their compositions were printed and were as widely distributed as the music of the Franco-Flemish composers who dominated music in Europe in the 16th century.

Peñalosa wrote masses, Magnificat settings, motets and hymns. Eleven secular compositions have survived, including an ensalada (a form of quodlibet) Por las sierras de Madrid for six voices.

Peñalosa was evidently fond of contrapuntal puzzles and canons, as evidenced by the quodlibet, and by the Agnus Dei of his Missa Ave Maria peregrina, which combines a plainsong tune with a retrograde (backwards) version of a famous secular song by Hayne van Ghizeghem.

One of his motets (Sancta mater istud agas) was long assumed to be by Josquin des Prez, which indicates both the stylistic similarity of their music and the high quality of Peñalosa's.

== Selected recordings ==
- Peñalosa: Complete Motets Pro Cantione Antiqua, Bruno Turner, Hyperion/Helios
- Peñalosa: Missa Nunca fue pena mayor. Sacris solemniis. Memorare Piissima. Ensemble Gilles Binchois, Les Saqueboutiers du Toulouse, Dominique Vellard, Glossa
- Peñalosa: Missa Ave Maria, Missa Nunca fue pena mayor. Choir of Westminster Cathedral, O'Donnell, Hyperion
- Peñalosa: Lamentationes. New York Polyphony. Bis.
