= Capella de Ministrers =

Spanish early music group

Capella de Ministrers is an early music group formed in 1987 in Valencia, Spain, by Carles Magraner. Valencian music is prominent in its repertoire.

== Work ==
Capella de Ministrers was formed in 1987 in Valencia by its director, the Valencian musicologist Carles Magraner (viola da gamba). The primary importance of the group is in the focus on restoring Valencian musical culture. Part of the group's mission is the recovery of Valencian musical heritage, from their first CD of 1989 - Música Barroca Valenciana. This first release contained little-known villancicos by a number of Valencian composers: Juan Cabanilles (1644–1712), Francisco Hernández Pla (d.1722), Joseph Pradas Gallén (1689–1757), Francisco Vicente Cervera (d.1749) and Pere Rabassa (1683–1767). The productions of the group follow the historical context to musical performance and releasing books with CDs, as in the book Music and Poetry for Ausiàs March, dedicated to the 15th Century Valencian poet.

The Iberian composers promoted by Capella de Ministrers cover a span of 500 years from anonymous medieval pieces such as found in the Llibre Vermell de Montserrat, El Cant de la Sibil·la, El Misterio de Elche, etc., through baroque works such as the ensaladas of Joan Brudieu, to better-known composers such as Vicente Martín y Soler. Soler's zarzuela La Madrileña (Madrid 1778) was revived by Magraner in 1996. The group has also promoted a revival in public and academic interest in the Majorcan composer Antonio de Literes by performance of Los Elementos and other works.

== Performance venues ==
=== Concert halls in Spain ===
The ensemble has performed numerous concerts since its foundation and has played in leading music venues in Spain, including the Auditorio Nacional de España, the Palau de la Música de Valencia and the Palau de la Música Catalana, Auditorio de León, Teatro de La Maestranza, El Escorial, Centro Conde Duque, Auditorio de Castellón, and Teatro Cervantes.

=== Festivals ===
It has also participated in numerous festivals, such as the Festival de Música Antiga de Barcelona, Madrid Cultural 1992 (with the revival of the opera Los elementos by Antonio Literes), the Festival de Teatro Clásico de Almagro, the Festival de Peralada, the Quinzena Musical Donostiarra, Los Veranos de la Villa (Madrid), the Festival Grec (Barcelona), the Festival Internacional de Música y Danza de Granada and the Festival de Música Religiosa de Cuenca, Serenates a la Universitat (Valencia), Festival Are More (Vigo), Festival Medieval de Elche, and the International Jewish Music Festival in Amsterdam.

=== Internationally ===
The group has also performed outside Spain. Within Europe it has performed in France, Belgium, Rumania, Portugal, Holland, Italy, Germany, England, Poland, Finland, Austria, Croatia, Greece, Sweden and Norway. Outside Europe it has performed in Chile, Argentina, Brazil, the United States, Mexico, Cuba, Tunisia, Egypt, Morocco, Algeria, China and Japan.

== Discography ==
=== Original recordings ===
- 1989 - Música Barroca Valenciana. EGT 526 CD. AVI 8025.
- 1990 - Cançoner del Duc de Calábria. EGT 536 CD. AVI 8017
- 1991 - Matías Navarro. Cantadas a solo, dos y tres voces con instrumentos. EGT 579 CD. AVI 8023
- 1993 - 'La España Virreinal. Maestros de capilla de la Catedral de Lima. EGT 631 CD. AVI 8018
- 1994 - Antonio Literes: Los Elementos. EGT 649 CD. AVI 8019. Licanus CDM 0617
- 1996 - Vicente Martín y Soler: La Madrileña. Madrid 1778. Licanus CDM 0410.
- 1997 - Joan Brudieu: Cant d'amor. EGT 708 CD. AVI 8024
- 1997 - Cancionero de Gandía|Cançoner de Gandia. EGT 695.

Reedited later as:
- El Canto de la Sibila. Auvidis Ibèrica (Naïve) AVI 8021

- 1999 - Antonio Teodoro Ortells: Oratorio Sacro. Naïve AVI 8015. Licanus CDM 0306.
- 1999 - Alfons el Magnànim. Música profana de la corte aragonesa en Reino de Nápoles (1450-1500). EGT 765 CD. Auvidis Ibèrica (Naïve) AVI 8022.
- 1999 - Oratorio Sacro a la Pasión de Cristo. CDM 0305.
- 1999 - Antoni Lliteres: Dánae|Danae. Blau CD 190.
- 2001 - Plaser y gasajo. Música cortesana en tiempos del Papa Alejandro VI. Auvidis Ibèrica (Naïve) AVI 8027.
- 2001 - Nunca fue pena mayor. Música Religiosa en torno al Papa Alejandro VI. With the Cor de la Generalitat Valenciana. Auvidis Ibèrica (Naïve) AVI 8026.
- 2001 - Concierto Espiritual. Naïve AVI 8029.
- 2001 - Trobadors. El Amor cortés|amor cortesano en la Edad Media. Auvidis Ibèrica (Naïve) AVI 8016. Licanus CDM 0308.
- 2002 - Llibre Vermell, Contrafactum de Morella. Cantos y danzas del siglo XIV. Licanus CDM 0201.
- 2002 - Iudicii Signum. Licanus CDM 0203.
- 2003 - Lamento di Tristano. Estampida medieval, danzas y música instrumental de la Edad Media. Licanus CDM 0307.
- 2003 - Misterí d'Elx - La Vespra. With the Cor de la Generalitat Valenciana. Licanus CDM 0304.
- 2003 - Il barbaro dolore. Arias y cantatas del siglo XVIII español. Licanus CDM 0305.
- 2004 - Cancionero de Palacio. Licanus CDM 0409.
- 2004 - Misterí d'Elx - La Festa. With the Cor de la Generalitat Valenciana. Licanus CDM 0411.
- 2005 - La Harpe de Melodie. Música en tiempo de Benedicto XIII, el Papa Luna. Works from Codex de Chantilly, Apt and Ivrea.
- 2006 - Dedicate alle Dame. Licanus CDM 0614.
- 2006 - Tomás Luis de Victoria: Réquiem. With the Cor de la Generalitat Valenciana. Licanus CDM 0615.
- 2007 - La Spagna. Danzas del Renacimiento español. Licanus CDM 0718.
- 2007 - John Dowland: Lachrimae or Seven Teares. Licanus CDM 0721.
- 2007 - Batalla Imperial. Música en tiempos de la Batalla de Almansa. Licanus CDM 0720.
- 2008 - Música Angélica. El repertorio mariano medieval. With the Cor de la Generalitat Valenciana. Institut Valencià de la Música PMV004.
- 2008 - Ad honorem Virginis. L'Ars antiqua|Ars Antiqua a la Corona de Aragón|Corona d´Aragó. Licanus CDM 0822.
- 2008 - Amors e Cansó. Trobadors de la Corona d’Aragó. Licanus CDM 0823.
- 2008 - Al-Hadiqat Al-Adai'a (El Jardín Perdido). Música i poesía andalusí a la València dels s.XII XIII. Licanus CDM 0824.
- 2008 - Feminae Vox. Huelgas Codex. Licanus CDM 0826.
- 2009 - Fantasiant, Música y Poesia per a Ausiàs March. Licanus CDM 0927.
- 2010 - Moresca. Romances y cantigas entre moros y cristianos. Licanus CDM 1028.
- 2010 - Els viatges de Tirant lo Blanch. Licanus CDM 1029.
- 2011 - Canticum Nativitatis Domini, Tomás Luis de Victoria. Licanus CDM 1130.
- 2012 - Batailla en Spagnol. Ensaladas de Flecha y Cárceres (cd + DVD) CDM 1231.
- 2013 - La Cité des Dames. Música y mujeres en la Edad Media. 2 cd. CDM 1333.
- 2014 - Música Encerrada. El legado oral de la diáspora sefardí. With Mara Aranda. CDM 1435.
- 2017 - Quattrocento. CDM 1742.
- 2017 - La Ruta de la Seda. CDM 1743.
- 2018 - Arrels. CDM 1844.
- 2018 - El Grial. CDM 1845.
- 2019 - Lucretia Borgia. CDM 1946.
- 2019 - A Circle in the Water. CDM 1947.
- 2020 - Super Lamentaciones. CDM 2048.
- 2020 - Germanies. CDM 2049.
- 2021 - Cantigas de Santa María. CDM 2150.
- 2021 - Claroscuro. CDM 2151.

=== Others ===
- 1998 - 10 anys. EGT 741 CD
- 2003 - 15 anys. Licanus CDM 0202.
- 2006 - Borgia. Música religiosa en torno al papa Alejandro VI (1492-1503). From Plaser y gasajo y Nunca fue pena mayor.
- 2007 - Tempus Fugit. 20 años de Capella de Ministrers. Licanus CDM 0719.
- 2008 - Música en temps de Jaume I. Licanus CDM 0825. Including:
  - 2008 - Ad honorem Virginis. L'Ars Antiqua a la Corona d´Aragó.
  - 2008 - Amors e Cansó. Trobadors de la Corona d’Aragó.
  - 2008 - Al-Hadiqat Al-Adai'a (El Jardín Perdido). Música i poesía andalusí a la València dels s. XII-XIII.
- 2012 - El cicle de la vida. 25 años de Capella de Ministrers. CDM 1232
- 2014 - El Greco. El viaje musical de Doménicos Teotocopóulos. CDM 1434
