= List of composers for lute (chronological) =

Below is a list of composers of lute music, ordered by chronology.

== 16th century ==
- Miguel de Fuenllana (c.1500–1579) (Spain)
- Luis de Milán (c.1500–1561) (Spain)
- Alonso Mudarra (1508–1580) (Spain)
- Diego Pisador (1509–1557) (Spain)
- Luis de Narváez (1510–1555) (Spain)
- Antonio de Cabezón (1510–1566) (Spain)
- Adrian Le Roy (1520–1598) (France)

== 17th century ==
- Francesco Corbetta (1612–1681) (Italy)
- Gaspar Sanz (1640–1710) (Spain)
- Robert de Visée (1650–1725) (France)
