= Pere Alberch Vila =

Catalan Renaissance composer and organist

- Pere Alberch i Vila
- Born: Pere Alberc i Ferrament; 1517; Vich, Principality of Catalonia, Crown of Aragon
- Died: 1582 (aged 64–65); Barcelona, Principality of Catalonia, Crown of Aragon
- Occupations: Composer, organist

Pere Alberch Vila (Catalan: Pere Alberc i Vila) (1517–1582): was a Catalan Renaissance composer and organist. He was born Pere Alberc i Ferrament at Vic in 1517. The nickname i Vila comes from a more notable branch of his family.

Alberch trained in the Cathedral of Vic and later, between 1534 and 1536, in Valencia with his uncle, Pere Vila. There he met other musicians working in the court of the Duke of Calabria, such as Mateo Flecha and Bartomeu Càrceres. From 1536 until his death, Alberch was organist at the Cathedral of Barcelona, and famed throughout Europe. He died in Barcelona.

== Works ==
Alberch's works include:

- A book of tientos for organ.
- 2 surviving ensaladas:
  - [wikisource:es:El bon jorn El bon jorn] (timing 11'50)
  - La Lucha (timing 8'29)
- Madrigals, published in Barcelona in 1561.

His book of madrigals marked the first use of the term by a Spanish composer. They were based on the texts of Pere Serafí and Ausiàs March, among others.

== Discography ==
- El bon jorn. La Lucha. On Las Ensaladas, Praga 1581, La Colombina dir. Josep Cabré K617 2009.
- Reyna soberana. Con voz llorosa. O Virgen sancta. On La Justa, La Colombina dir. Josep Cabré Accent 1994.
