= Rabassa =

Rabassa is a Catalan language surname. Notable people with the surname include:

- Enric Rabassa, Spanish footballer and coach
- Gregory Rabassa (1922–2016), American translator
- Jorge Rabassa, Argentine geologist
- Pere Rabassa (1683–1767), Spanish composer and musicologist
