= Joan Brudieu =

Catalan Spanish composer

Joan Brudieu (Catalan pronunciation: [ʒuˈam bɾuðiˈew]; 1520–1591) was a French-Catalan composer. Brudieu was born around 1520 in the diocese of Limoges and died in la Seu d'Urgell in 1591, after spending most of his life in the Aragonese region of Catalonia.

From 1539 he was cantor at the Cathedral of Santa Maria d'Urgell, where he was ordained in 1546. In 1548 he was appointed choir master for life. In 1550 he traveled to his home country to acquire instruments for the chapel.

In 1577 he retired to Balaguer, but after a year moved to become maestro di cappella at Santa Maria del Mar, Barcelona, which he left shortly afterwards, apparently due to health problems. Then in 1579 he returned to la Seu d'Urgell, where he remained until his death, having previously been replaced by Rafael Coma.

== Works ==
Requiem - in edition by Felipe Pedrell.

In his madrigals Brudieu was influenced by ensaladas of Mateo Flecha (1481–1553).

Madrigals - in edition by Tomeu Quetgles. Madrigal V - in edition by Maricarmen Gómez, Las ensaladas (Praga, 1581) con un suplemento de obras del género. Valencia, Generalitat, 2008. ISBN 978-84-482-4890-1

Vol. 1 Joan Brudieu's five madrigals in Catalan:

1. Los goigs de Nostra Dona (The seven joys of our Lady)
2. Madrigal XIII (1st part: Fantasiant, amor a mi descobre, (with text by Ausiàs March), - Fancying, Love reveals me the great secrets-, 2nd part: Si fos amor, substància raonable -If Love was a reasonable substance-, 3rd part: Llir entre cards -Lily among thistles).
3. Madrigal XIV (1st part: No hi ha béns, no hi ha fortuna -There are no goods, there is no fortune, 2nd part: Lo que no es fa per potència -What cannot be done by strength-)
4. Madrigal XV (1st part: Ma voluntat amb la raó s´envolupa -My will is wrapped up in the reason-, con texto de Ausiàs March, 2nd part: Plena de seny -Full of wisdom-)
5. Madrigal XVI (1st part: Si l´amor en un ser dura -If Love in someone is long-lasting-, 2nd part: Molts de l´amor tenen queixa -Many people complain about Love-, 3rd part: És comú parlar del poble -It is commonly heard said-, 4th part: Les sagetes que amor tira -The arrows which Love shoots-).

Vol. 2 This volume contains the following madrigals by Joan Brudieu in Spanish:

1. Madrigal II (1st part: Oid, oid -Listen, you who have...-, 2nd part: Pastor Major -Chief shepherd, who...-)
2. Madrigal III (1st part: Pues no se puede hazer -Since it is not possible to do-, 2nd part: Amor me tiene olvidada -I have been forgotten by Love-)
3. Madrigal IV (1st part: Dame un remedio, Constança -Give me a remedy, Constance-, 2nd part: Esperança m´entretiene -Hope distracts me-)
4. Madrigal V (1st part: L´Amor i la Magestad -Love and Majesty-, 2nd part: Saca el Amor -Love has on his side-, 3rd part: Ya tocan los tabales -The kettledrums are already sounding-, 4th part: ¿Qué trae en la bandereta? -What is written on his pennon?-, 5th part: ¡Cómo corrió buena lança! -How well the lancer rode-, 6th part: Cada cual en su cabeça -Each person on his head-, 7th part: Sepamos cómo cayó -Let us find out how he fell-).

Vol. 3 This volume contains the last seven madrigals in Spanish by Joan Brudieu:

1. Madrigal VI (1st part: Qué sientes, dime, Pascual -What do you feel, tell me, Pascual?-, 2nd part: Dexa, Pascual, tal tormento -Leave that anguish, Pascual-)
2. Madrigal VII "en proporción" (1st part: Qué sientes, dime, Pascual -What do you feel, tell me, Pascual?-, 2nd part: Dexa, Pascual, tal tormento -Leave that anguish, Pascual-, 3rd part: ¿No ves, pastor, tu cuidado? Don't you see, shephered, your longing?-)
3. Madrigal VIII (1st part: Del amor se va riendo -She laughs at Love-, 2nd part: Del amor Amor quexoso -Love, complaining of love-)
4. Madrigal IX "en proporción" (1st part: Del amor se va riendo -She laughs at Love-)
5. Madrigal X (1st part: Zagala más linda y bella -Lass, nicer and prettier, 2nd part: Estos tus hermosos ojos -Those beautiful eyes of yours-)
6. Madrigal XI (1st part: Oios claros y serenos -Clear and calm eyes-, 2nd part: Oios, con que miréis -Eyes, if you look at me-)
7. Madrigal XII (1st part: Si de los ojos nasce -If seeing and wishing-, 2nd part: Si una dulce vista -If a sweet sight-)

== Recordings ==
- La Justa. Madrigals and Ensaladas from 16th century Catalonia. La Colombina - Josep Benet. Recorded 1994. Accent 94103 reissued Accent 10103.
- Cant d'amor: Madrigals de Joan Brudieu. Carles Magraner, Capella de Ministrers. Tabalet Estudis, València, 1997.
- Fantasiant. Música y Poesia per a Ausiàs March. Book and CD. Carles Magraner, Capella de Ministrers. Licanus 2009.
