= Valderrábano (surname) =

Valderrábano is a surname. Notable people with the surname include:

- Enríquez de Valderrábano (c. 1500–after 1557), Spanish vihuelist and composer
- Victor Valderrabano (born 1972), Swiss orthopedic surgeon
