= Ríu Ríu Chíu =

Spanish villancico

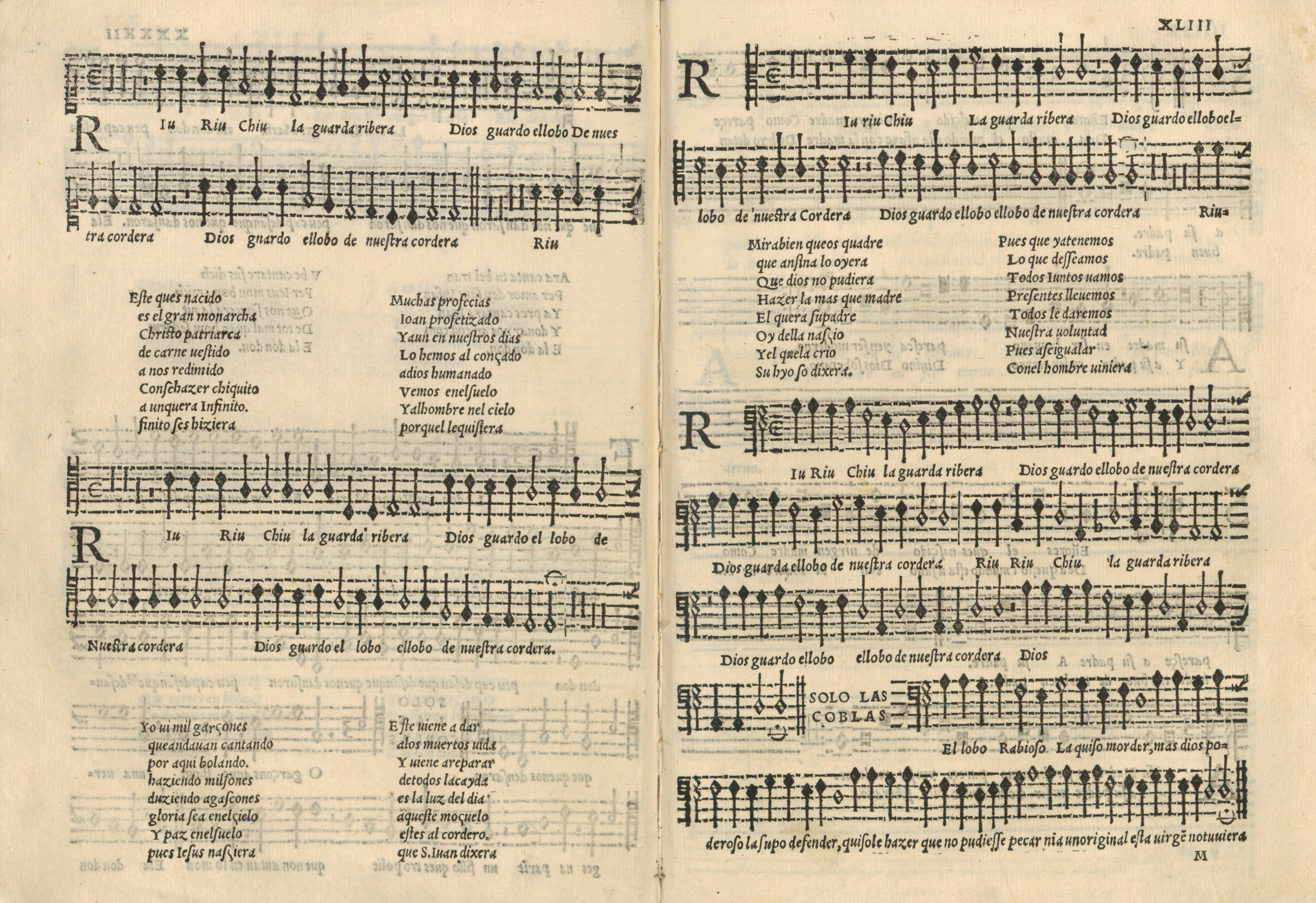
Original musical score

Beginning fragment of the villancico

Slightly more polyphonic beginning fragment

Ríu Ríu Chíu, sometimes shortened to Ríu Ríu or Ríu Chíu, is a Spanish villancico that has attained some contemporary fame as a Christmas carol attributed to the Feast of the Immaculate Conception during Advent.

== Origins ==
The villancico is attributed by some sources to Mateo Flecha the Elder, who died in 1553; it has also been described as anonymous. The song also bears a strong resemblance to another villancico, Falalanlera, by Bartomeu Càrceres, an Aragonese composer. It is known from a single source, the Cancionero de Upsala, published in 1556 in Venice; a unique copy is preserved at the library of the University of Uppsala. The song appears as the fortieth song of that collection. Daniel R. Melamed described the song as "redoubtable", and mentions it as a contender for the best known piece of Renaissance music.

The apparently nonsense syllables ríu ríu chíu are often taken to represent the song of a nightingale, while the context and etymology are compatible with the call of a kingfisher.

Riu translates as river in the Catalan language, in agreement with the birth place of the accredited composer, and was translated as river by the Monkees, where the roaring river prevented a wolf from crossing to attack sheep.

== Lyrics and themes ==
The basic theme of the song is the nativity of Christ. The refrain which gives the villancico its title goes:

Ríu, ríu, chíu, la guarda ribera,
Dios guardó el lobo de nuestra cordera.

"[With a cry of] Ríu, ríu, chíu, the kingfisher, God kept the wolf from our Lamb."

The Immaculate Conception is mentioned in the lyrics:

El lobo rabioso la quiso morder
Mas Dios Poderoso la supo defender
Quísola hacer que no pudiese pecar
Ni aun original esta virgen no tuviera.

"The raging wolf sought to bite her, but God Almighty knew (how) to defend her; He chose to make her so that she could not sin; no original sin was found in that virgin."

The song also mentions themes of the Incarnation and Christmas:

Éste que es nacido es el Gran Monarca
Cristo Patriarca de carne vestido
Ha nos redimido con se hacer chiquito
Aunque era infinito finito se hiciera.

"This one that is born is the Great King, Christ the Patriarch clothed in flesh. He redeemed us when He made himself small, though He was Infinite He would make himself finite."

Muchas profecías lo han profetizado
Y aún en nuestros días lo hemos alcanzado
A Dios humanado vemos en el suelo
Y al hombre en el cielo porque Él le quisiera

"Many prophecies have prophesied it, and even in our days we have reached it, God in flesh we see on the ground, and men in heaven because He would wanted"

Yo vi mil Garzones que andavan cantando
Por aqui volando haciendo mil sones
Diciendo a gascones Gloria sea en el Cielo
Y paz en el suelo pues Jesús nasciera.

"I saw a thousand boys (angels) go singing, here making a thousand voices while flying, telling the shepherds of glory in the heavens, and peace to the world since Jesus has been born"

== Performances ==
Classical and early music performers of the song include the Boston Camerata and the Oxford Camerata.

In 1967, the Monkees performed the song live on "The Monkees' Christmas Show", a Christmas episode of their TV series. A studio version was released on subsequent compilation albums (and later on the 2018 album Christmas Party). The Monkees' producer, Chip Douglas, had performed it himself with his former band, the Modern Folk Quartet, on their 1964 album Changes.

The song was performed in Spanish at King's College, Cambridge in their 1992 Christmas Eve broadcast service of "Nine Lessons and Carols".

The song has appeared on recordings including:

- Goin' Places (1961) by the Kingston Trio (listed as "Guardo el Lobo" and credited to musicologist Erich Schwandt)
- A Renaissance Christmas Celebration With the Waverly Consort (1977) by Waverly Consort
- A Little Christmas Music (1989) by The King's Singers
- Our Heart's Joy: A Chanticleer Christmas (1990) by Chanticleer
- The Season (1990) by Fred Penner
- Christmas (1993) by Bruce Cockburn
- Christmas Around the World (2000) by Bradley Joseph
- Cynara (2000) by Anúna
- Midwinter (2003) by the McDades with Terry McDade
- The Dawn of Grace (2008) by Sixpence None the Richer
- Christmas from the Heart (2009) by David Archuleta
- O Holy Night (2012) by Millennial Choirs and Orchestras (listed as "Jesús Nasciera")
- Deepest December (2015) by Patricia O'Callaghan

== See also ==
- List of Christmas carols
