= Nova Lux =

Nova Lux (Latin "New Light") may refer to:

- Nova Lux Ensemble of the Coral de Cámara de Pamplona
- List of Carthusian monasteries Utrecht Charterhouse (Kartuize Nieuwlicht or Nova Lux)
- Nova Lux 1648 work by Ignazio Lupi of Bergamo
