= Quodlibet =

Form of musical composition

A quodlibet (/ˈkwɒdlɪbɛt/; Latin for "whatever you wish" from quod, "what" and libet, "pleases") is a musical composition that combines several different melodies—usually popular tunes—in counterpoint, and often in a light-hearted, humorous manner.

There are three main types of quodlibet:

- A catalogue quodlibet consists of a free setting of catalogue poetry (usually humorous lists of loosely related items).
- In a successive quodlibet, one voice has short musical quotations and textual quotations while the other voices provide homophonic accompaniment.
- In a simultaneous quodlibet, two or more pre-existing melodies are combined. The simultaneous quodlibet may be considered a historical antecedent to the modern-day musical mashup. Simultaneous quodlibets are found in elementary music classes, referred to as Partner Songs.

== History ==
=== Renaissance ===
The quodlibet originated in 15th-century Europe, during a time when the practice of combining folk tunes was popular. Composer Wolfgang Schmeltzl first used the term in a specifically musical context in 1544.

The Por las sierras de Madrid by Francisco de Peñalosa (c. 1470–1528) is an ensalada -an early form of the quodlibet- contained in the Cancionero Musical de Palacio, a manuscript of the early 16th century. Composer Ludwig Senfl (1486–1542/43) was able to juxtapose several pre-existing melodies in a cantus firmus quodlibet; one such piece, "Ach Elslein, liebes Elselein" / "Es taget", was noted for its symbolism rather than its humor. In Spain, 1581 saw the publication of the ensaladas of Mateo Flecha et al. The ensaladas were comical compositions that mixed literary texts in a way similar to the quodlibet.

It was not until 1618, however, that anyone published a rigorous definition of the quodlibet: Michael Praetorius described it as "a mixture of diverse elements quoted from sacred and secular compositions". During the Renaissance, a composer's ability to juxtapose several pre-existing melodies, such as in the cantus firmus quodlibet, was considered the ultimate mastery of counterpoint.

=== 19th century to today ===
The quodlibet took on additional functions between the beginning and middle of the 19th century, when it became known as the potpourri and the musical switch. In these forms, the quodlibet would often feature anywhere from six to fifty or more consecutive "quotations"; the distinct incongruity between words and music served as a potent source of parody and entertainment. In the 20th century, the quodlibet remained a genre in which well-known tunes and/or texts were quoted, either simultaneously or in succession, generally for humorous effect.

== Examples ==
=== Classical music ===
- The masses of Jacob Obrecht, which sometimes combine popular tunes, plainsong and original music.
- The last (thirtieth) variation of Bach's Goldberg Variations is a quodlibet.
- Bach's Wedding Quodlibet or Quodlibet, which is not a quodlibet by the above definition but a ten-minute procession of nonsense, jokes, puns, obscure cultural references, word games, and parody of other songs. At times, the music imitates a chaconne and a fugue while deliberately obscuring the counterpoint. It is unlike any of Bach's other works, though the sole surviving source is a fair copy manuscript in Bach's own handwriting.
- Gallimathias musicum, a 17-part quodlibet composed by Wolfgang Amadeus Mozart at the age of ten.
- Louis Moreau Gottschalk combined "Hail, Columbia" and "Yankee Doodle" at the end of his piano piece, The Union.
- Symphony No. 4 of Charles Ives, like most of Ives' music, includes frequent popular and band tunes which unfold independently from the rest of the music.
- Scherzo from Charles Ives' piano trio labeled "TSIAJ" (This scherzo is a joke), includes the American fraternity tunes "My Old Kentucky Home", "Sailor's Hornpipe", "The Campbells Are Coming", "Long, Long Ago", "Hold the Fort", and "There Is a Fountain Filled with Blood", among others.
- Quodlibet on Welsh Nursery Rhymes by Welsh composer Alun Hoddinott.
- Pianist Glenn Gould improvised a quodlibet including "The Star-Spangled Banner" and "God Save the King". According to his account, Gould came up with this quodlibet while taking a bath.
- Peter Schickele's Quodlibet for Small Orchestra, Unbegun Symphony, Eine Kleine Nichtmusik, and others.
- Allan Sherman's "Variations on How Dry I Am" from the album "Peter and the Commissar".
- Fantasia on Auld Lang Syne (1976) by Ernest Tomlinson. The composer claims that the piece references 129 works.

=== Popular music ===
- The Grateful Dead's medley "That's It for the Other One", on their album Anthem of the Sun, includes the movement "Quadlibet for Tender Feet" (sic).
- Scholar Alan W. Pollack has pointed out that The Beatles' "I've Got a Feeling" is a quodlibet of sorts.
- "I Believe" – Stan Beard and Barry Tucker published a quodlibet arrangement of this popular sacred song with Bach-Gounod "Ave Maria" in 1972.
- Nina Simone's 1958 interpretation of "Little Girl Blue" is a quodlibet, combining the Rodgers and Hart melody and lyrics with the melody of the popular carol "Good King Wenceslas".

== See also ==
- Contrast (music)
- Mashup (music)
- Medley (music)
- Musical parody
- Potpourri (music)
