= Francisco de Santiago =

- Office: Maestro de capilla de la Catedral de Sevilla
- Term: 1617-1642
- Predecessor: Alonso Lobo
- Successor: Luis Bernardo Jalón

Fray Francisco de Santiago (Lisbon, 1578? – Seville, October 6, 1644) was a Portuguese composer who occupied the post of Maestro de Capilla (i.e. music director) in the Cathedral of Seville between 1617 and 1642. His musical production was extensive and much appreciated by his contemporaries. However, more than 600 of his works, which were held in the library of King John IV of Portugal, were burned in the terrible fire that occurred in Lisbon after the earthquake of November 1, 1755.

== Works ==
A few of his works have survived in musical archives in Spain, Portugal, Mexico and Bolivia. These include:

=== In Spanish ===
- "Ay como flecha la niña" in 3 voices, Baroque villancico to the Virgin of the Immaculate Conception.
- "Que por allí por allá", Baroque villancico to the Virgin of the Immaculate Conception.
- "Muy de veras estamos pastores" in 2 and 6 voices, Baroque Christmas villancico.
- "Qué mesura señores es esta" in 8 voices, Christmas ensalada.
- "Tírale flechas" / "Zagalejo hermoso" in 4 and 8 voices, Baroque Christmas villancico.
- "Tus divinas lágrimas bellas", Baroque Christmas villancico.
- "Un Cupido nos ha nacido" in 4 and 6 voices, Baroque Christmas villancico.
- "Arroyuelo presuroso" in 4 voices.

=== In Latin ===
- "Missa de Batalha" in 8 voices
- "Beatus vir" in 10 voices
- "Regina coeli laetare"
- "Conceptio tua" in 5 voices
- "Conceptio tua" in 9 voices
- "Nec lingua valet" in 5 voices
- "Nos apunturis" / "Plaudat turba"
- "Virginis summe" in 5 voices
- "Missa" (incompleta)
