= Nova Lux Ensemble =

The Nova Lux Ensemble is a Spanish choral group, an ensemble of la Coral de Cámara de Pamplona. The ensemble was formerly led by David Guindano Igarreta and is currently directed by Josep Cabré.

== Discography ==
- Miguel de Irízar Domenzain: Lamentaciones, motetes y tonos para Miserere. Josep Cabré 2011
- Urbán de Vargas: A casarse con el alma. Josep Cabré 2010
- Miguel Hilarión Eslava y Elizondo: Mass and motets. David Guindano Igarreta 2008
- Michael Navarrus: Primeras Vísperas para San Fermín. David Guindano Igarreta 2007 2CD
- Juan Frances de Iribarren Salmos, Villancicos y Cantadas. David Guindano Igarreta 2006 2CD
- Mateo Flecha el Joven Sento l'aura soave - Il primo libro de Madrigali. David Guindano Igarreta 2006 2CD
