= K. A. Colorado =

American-Canadian visual artist

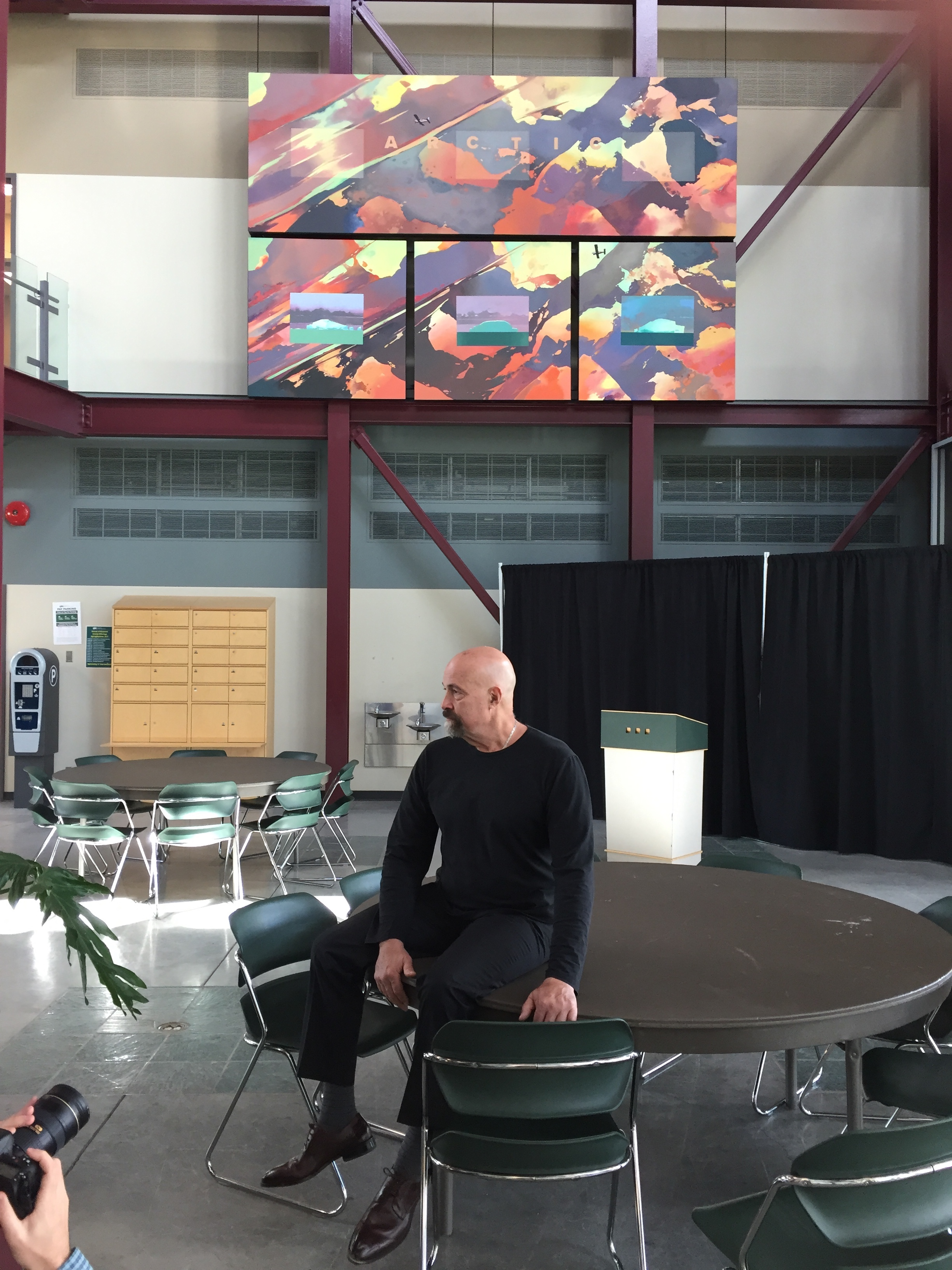
Colorado with one of his monumental painting series depicting polar and Arctic themes, 2017

K.A. Colorado (Kenneth Auther Colorado, born 5 April 1946) is an American-Canadian visual artist, painter, and sculptor. He is known for his representational work depicting climate change and the environment.

== Series and exhibitions ==
In 2003, Colorado began a series of Iceberg Paintings that portrayed icebergs below and above the waterline, with light reflecting and refracting. Jorge Rabassa invited Colorado to the Arctic Scientific Research Library in Ushuaia, Argentina.

In 2008, Colorado began his proprietary series of Ice Core Sculptures, a group of over 100 three-dimensional artworks. These portrayed scientific ice cores such as those used by scientists to analyze historical environmental data and incorporating written script, DNA, or artifacts from scientists and Polar regions. Colorado was selected as Artist of the Year by LA Artcore Union Center in 2008, and was given a special exhibition of his art in 2009, entitled Polar Dialogue 2009, which featured sculptures and paintings. The show included several of Colorado's Ice Core Sculpture Series.

Colorado completed a group of paintings in 2011 entitled A 60-Second Time-Lapse of the World depicting vanishing icebergs among warm skies in the Arctic. The paintings were installed at the Portland International Airport (Oregon) main entrance, and were exhibited during 2011 and 2012.

Colorado was invited by the Argentine Ministerio de Relaciones Exteriores y Culto and the Dirección Nacional del Antártico of Argentina to perform on-site art installations on the continent of Antarctica in early 2012. During his residency in Antarctica, Colorado completed a series of five Banquet in the Antarctic groups of works involving sculpture, photography, video, and performance-art installations. Colorado participated by invitation in Antarctic Week, a conference presented by the government of Tierra del Fuego. Colorado's installations, Banquet in Antarctica, were featured at the Fuegian Museum of Art (Museo Fueguino de Arte) and the Museo Del Fin Del Mundo during the 10th Science and Technology Week and the Antarctic Week. Colorado documented his time in Antarctica and the Arctic in his two films, Melt and Carbon.

Colorado created a series of paintings in 2015 that is about the 'fragility' of icebergs in the global warming in the Arctic. The large paintings group, entitled 60 Seconds in the Canadian Arctic, was exhibited at the Vancouver Maritime Museum in British Columbia, Canada, for three years, from 2015 to 2018.

On Earth Day, April 22, 2025, Douglas College, in New Westminster, B.C., Canada, held a reception with guests from several countries to unveil three of Colorado's oil paintings depicting the impact of climate change on glacial ice. The gift of this artwork entitled Retreat • Glacier • Ablation is a continuation of the artist's focus on the environment and on the importance of polar ice, and is permanently installed in the New Westminster Campus Library.

== Published works ==
Colorado is one of the two founders of an International Snow and Ice Sculpture Competition and Winter Festival in Perm, Russia. First held in 1995, the festival "Snow, Ice, and Fire" is an exhibition of ice and snow sculptures performed by sculptors from around the world.

The National Oceanic and Atmospheric Administration (NOAA) contacted Colorado to become artist-in-residence for the National Marine Sanctuary System in 2015. Then, he completed a sculptural series of Ice Core Sculptures for the National Marine Sanctuaries. Colorado's environmental art installation at a retreating glacier in the Yukon was published in the June 2018 issue of the Journal of Maps. During 2018 and 2019, Colorado was an artist-in-residence at the University of Northern British Columbia in Canada. Here he completed two additional art pieces installed in the Hakai Cryosphere Node, and in the university campus main hall.

In August 2022, a visual essay that Environment magazine invited K.A. Colorado to publish with them, entitled "The Climate Change Art of K.A. Colorado”, was published by Taylor & Francis. An introduction written by one of the editors, introducing K.A. Colorado’s art and poetry essay and entitled "The Power of Art”, was published in the same issue on August 30, 2022.
