= Ensalada (music) =

The ensalada (Spanish for salad) is a genre of polyphonic secular music mixing languages and dialects and nonsensical quodlibets.

The term is known mainly through a publication, Las Ensaladas de Flecha Prague (1581), by Mateo Flecha the Younger, that contains six long four-part vocal compositions by his uncle Mateo Flecha (1481–1553). Each of these ensaladas is divided into several sections, ranging from seven to twelve. The music is for four voices.

Apart from the ensaladas by Mateo Flecha, there are also two examples by Mateo Flecha the younger, two by Pere Alberch Vila, several by Bartolomé Cárceres, one by the unknown F. Chacón and several anonymous sources. There is also an instrumental ensalada for organ by Sebastián Aguilera de Heredia.

== Works ==
Prague 1581

1. El Fuego (the fire) – Flecha
2. La Bomba (the pump) – Flecha
3. La Negrina (the black girl) – Flecha
4. La Guerra (the battle) – Flecha
5. El Bon Jorn (the good day) – Vila
6. La Justa (the joust) – Flecha
7. La Viuda (the widow) – Flecha
8. La Feria (the fair) – Flecha (the younger)
9. Las Cañas (the pan-pipas) – Flecha (the younger)
10. La Trulla - Càrceres
11. La Lucha (the struggle) – Vila
12. Los Chistes (the jokes) – Flecha
13. Las Cañas II (the pan-pipes II) – Flecha
14. El Molino (the mill) – Chacón

Supplement

1. El Jubilate – Flecha
2. La Caza (the hunt) – Flecha
3. El Toro (the bull) – Flecha
4. La Negrina (the black woman) – Cárceres
5. Las Cañas III (the pan-pipes III) – Brudieu

Francisco de Peñalosa

1. Por las sierras de Madrid, for 6 voices.
2. Tú que vienes de camino, for 2 voices.

Garcimuñóz (attributed)

1. Una montaña pasando, for 4 voices

Anon.

- Quien madruga Dios le ayuda. Romancero 1612

== Sources ==
Manuscripts

- Barcelona, Biblioteca de Catalunya, Ms 454 (Cancionero de Barcelona).
- Barcelona, Biblioteca de Catalunya. Ms 588 I
- Barcelona, Biblioteca de Catalunya. Ms 588 II.
- Cancionero de Medinaceli Palma de Mallorca, Fundación Bartolomé March

Printed editions

- Cancionero de Uppsala. Villancicos de diversos autores. Jerónimo Scotto. Venecia. 1556
- Las ensaladas de Flecha. Mateo Flecha el joven. Editor: Lorge Negrino. Praga. 1581. (only bass survives)
- Le difficile de Chansons. Second Livre. Jacques Moderne. Lyon. La justa, titled La Bataille en Spagnol.

Transcriptions for voice and vihuela

- Orphénica Lyra, Miguel de Fuenllana.
- Silva de Sirenas, Enríquez de Valderrábano.
- Libro de música de vihuela, Diego Pisador.
