= Music of the Valencian Community =

The music of the Valencian Community in eastern Spain is rich and diverse due to external influences. It can be broadly divided into two categories: traditional and contemporary music.

== Traditional music ==
Little is known about Valencian music in ancient times, with some prehistoric pictorial remains of Valencia and Alicante as only testimonies of musical activity. With the Muslim conquest of the Iberian Peninsula, and since the 9th century, the Córdoba musical tradition spread to Valencia and Xàtiva. The oldest musical documents preserved in the Land of Valencia are Christian ones, such as the filled epistles and the Song of the Sibyl, a liturgical drama of Catalan origin. Another medieval liturgical drama, the Mystery of Elx, stands out.

The Land of Valencia is known for its own variety of Jota and a rich dolçaina (shawm) tradition. Brass bands are found in almost every village in the region, originating in the 19th century. The Muixeranga, a street festival, is an important tradition that originated in Valencia.

Religious and work songs are common in Valencia, many are performed with accompaniment. El Misteri d'Elx is an old, religious musical play that dates back to mediaeval times. Havaneres are popular all along the Valencian coast.

Valencian dances include:

- Fandango of Albaida
- El Ball del Danzants
- El Ball dels Oficis
- Los Alcides
- Els Bastonets
- Els Porrots
- Paloteo of Requena
- Valencian Jota

== Contemporary music ==
In the 1980s bakalao was the dominant dance music form that appeared in the club scene of the city and the surrounding community. While pop and rock are forms enjoyed and played by local musicians there is a strong tendency towards electronica in the region. In the 1990s techno music continued to be a string favourite in the area with the heavier schranz influence from northern Europe emerging in the early 2000s. Today minimal techno is popular and more recently the trip-tek style as a young knights living to outfits such as Electrika-MixTek.

Valencian/Catalan rock and ska music is also common all throughout the Land of Valencia.

Valencia has a sleight of bands and singers that have popped up in the last 3–5 years that are creating their own brand of urban, jazzy, and funky music like Ay Trick, Vincen Garcia, Xixa Mora, Astral Voyage, Adrian Black, The Willards, Think Mogul, Barbara Gramage, and more.
