= Mateo Flecha el Joven =

Catalan composer

Mateo Flecha el Joven, in Catalan Mateu Fletxa el Jove (Prades. Baix Camp, c. 1530 – Sant Pere de la Portella, Berguedà, 20 February 1604) was a Catalan composer, and nephew of Mateo Flecha the Elder.

He took up the Carmelite habit in Valencia. Much appreciated by Pope Sixtus V, he was an outstanding musician and prefect of the musicians of Charles V. After residing in Italy for an uncertain period, in 1564 he was chaplain to Maria-Theresa, wife of Maximilian II, Holy Roman Emperor, and later he was a singer of the imperial chapel. When Maximilian died, Emperor Rudolf II names him Abbot of Tihany (Plattensee, Hungary). In the years 1570, 1581 and 1586, he travellend along Spain to recruit singers for the imperial chapel.

His main works were published in Venice and in Prague, a city he had visited several times. In Venice he published Il 1.° libro de madrigali a 4 et 5 (1568, "The First Book of Madrigals at 4/5 voices"), a collection of 31 madrigals. In Prague he printed, in 1581, three polyphonic music books: Libro de música de punto, in four volumes but lost, Divinarum completarum psalmi, incomplete, and Las ensaladas, dedicated to Giovanni Borgia. This latest collection contains eight ensaladas from Flecha the Elder, three from himself, two from, one from Bartomeu Càrceres and one from Xacón. In 1593 he published in Prague a poetic book on the death of Elisabeth of Austria, Queen of France. Two notable works of his, preserved in manuscript form, are Harmonia a 5, for five string instruments, and a Miserere at 4 voices. In 1599 Philip III of Castile appointed him Abbot of the Portella Monastery, where he retired.
