= Mateo Flecha =

Spanish musician (1481–1553)

Mateo Flecha (Catalan: Mateu Fletxa; 1481–1553) was a Spanish composer born in Kingdom of Aragon, in the region of Prades. He is sometimes known as "El Viejo" (the elder) to distinguish him from his nephew, Mateo Flecha "El Joven" (the younger), also a composer of madrigals. "El Viejo" is best known for his ensaladas, published in Prague in 1581 by the same nephew.

== Life and career ==
Mateo Flecha directed the music at the cathedral of Lleida (September 1523 – October 1525). From there he moved to Guadalajara, in the service for six years of the Duke, Diego Hurtado de Mendoza. From there he went to Valencia where he assumed direction of the chapel choir of the Duke of Calabria. While thus employed, three of his works were included in songbooks associated with that chapel, including the Cancionero de Uppsala. In 1537 Flecha moved to Sigüenza where he served as maestro di cappella for two years. From 1544 to 1548 he lived in the castle at Arévalo as teacher of the Infantas Maria and Joanna, daughters of Charles V, Holy Roman Emperor (1500-1558). Toward the end of his life Mateo Flecha became a monk of the Cistercian Order, living in the Monastery at Poblet, where he died in 1553.

Flecha's ensaladas influenced the madrigals of Joan Brudieu.

== Works ==
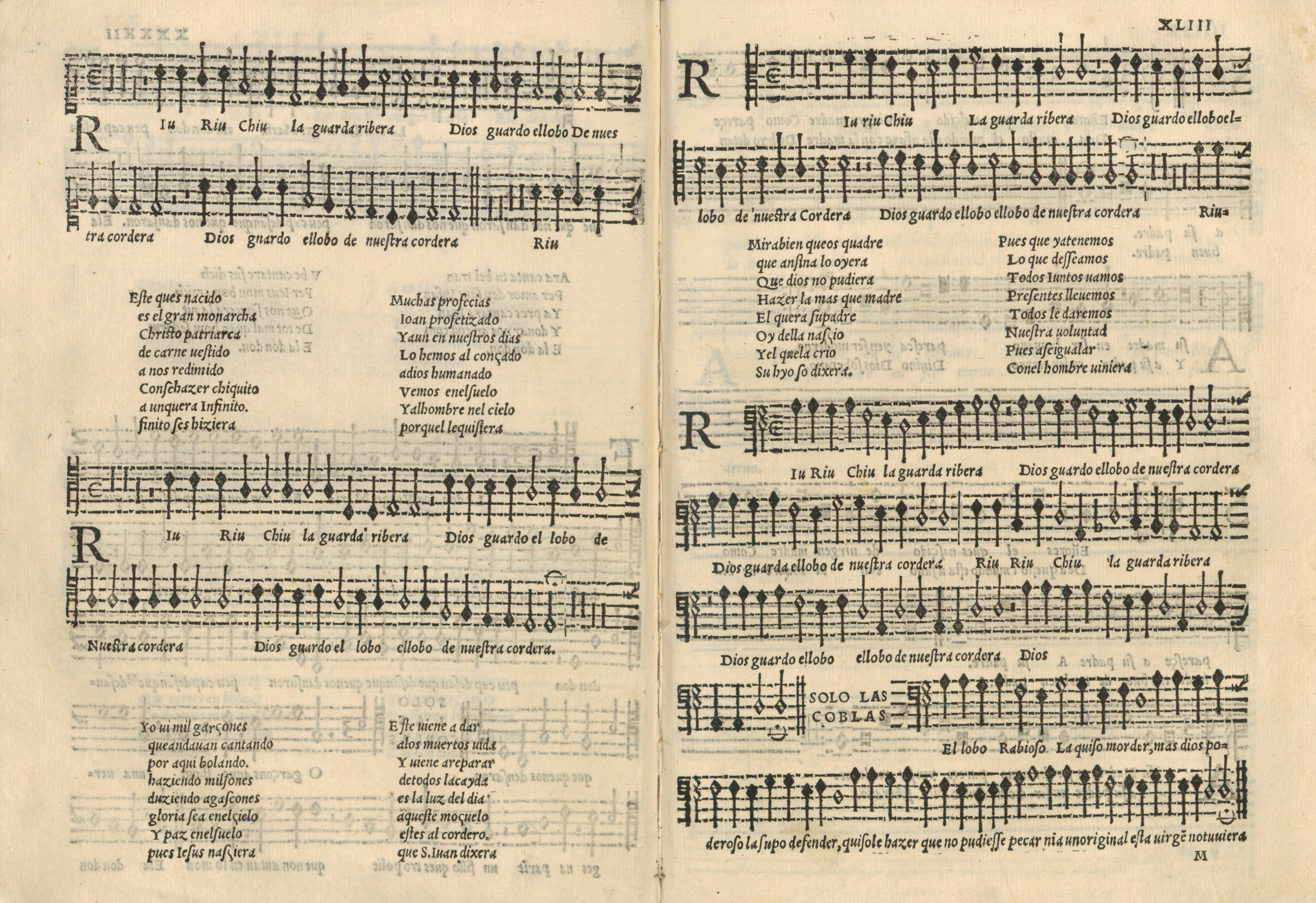
1556 musical score of Flecha's Ríu Ríu Chíu

Mateo Flecha's music was published in part by Fuenllana in his Orphenica Lira. The majority of his works can be found in the Cancionero of the Duke of Calabria (Venice, 1556), also known as the “Cancionero de Uppsala.” Flecha is best known as composer of the "ensalada" (literally "salad"), a work for four or five voices written for the diversion of courtiers in the palace. The ensalada frequently mixed languages: Spanish, Catalan, Italian, French, and Latin. In addition to the ensalada, Flecha is known for his villancicos.

In 1581 Flecha's ensaladas were published by his nephew, Mateo Flecha "El Joven" (the younger), in Prague. Of the eleven ensaladas, complete versions remain of only six, El jubilate, La bomba, La negrina, La guerra, El fuego, and La justa. Four of the others are missing a voice. El cantate is lost because Flecha's nephew did not publish it, considering it to be too long.

Various Spanish vihuelists, like Enríquez de Valderrábano, Diego Pisador, and Miguel de Fuenllana, adapted Flecha's works for the vihuela.

=== List of works ===
Although he surely wrote more than the following, the following compositions are known to be the work of Mateo Flecha El Viejo:

Ensaladas for 4 voices:

- El fuego
- El jubilate
- La bomba
- La caça
- La guerra
- La justa
- La negrina
- La viuda

Ensaladas for 5 voices:

- Las cañas
- Los chistes
- El cantate o dança despadas (lost)

Villancicos for 3 voices:

- Encúbrase el mal que siento
- O triste de mí
- Si sentís lo que yo siento
- Vella de vós som amorós (attributed to Flecha)

Teresica hermana by Collegium Vocale Bydgoszcz

Villancicos for 4 voices:

- Mal haya quien a vos casó
- Que farem del pobre Joan
- Teresica hermana
- Tiempo bueno
- Riu Chiu

Villancicos for 5 voices:

- Si amores me han de matar

Sacred works in Latin:

- Miserere (4 voices)
- Doleo super te (lost)
