= Mara Aranda =

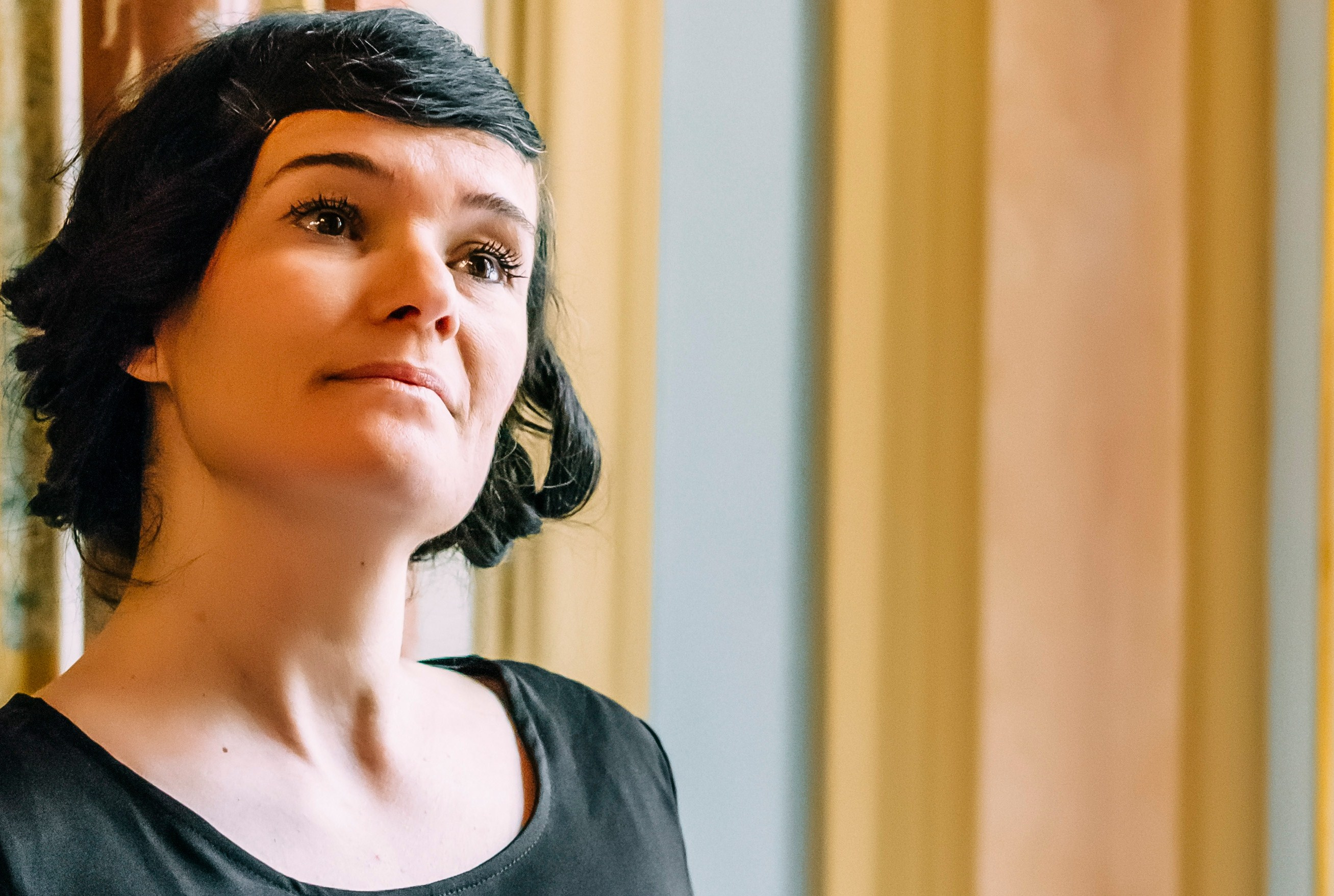

Background information
- Born: December 6, 1968 (age 57); Valencia, Spain
- Genre: World
- Occupations: Performer, composer
- Years active: 1998-present
- Labels: Galileo Music, Bureo Músiques
- Website: www.mara-aranda.com

Mara Aranda (born 6 December 1968) is a Spanish singer. She is known for rediscovering and reviving the musical heritage of Sephardic Jews.

== Biography ==
She was born and raised in Valencia. Motivated by her desire to study and research traditional music, she traveled and lived in Crete during 2003 and 2004. In 2005, she moved to Thessaloniki, Greece, where she studied folklore, moved traditional vocals and music in depth. She got to grips with religious Byzantine chant with Drossos Kutsokostas.

It was also in Thessaloniki, - the Jerusalem of the Balkans for the Sephardim -, where she began to complete her repertoire by exploring more the Western perspective due to her proximity to mainland Spain.

Mara Aranda's research and compilation is reflected in the album titled "Musiques i Cants Sefardis d’Orient i Occident" (Sephardic music and song from East and West) with Aman Aman and published by Galileo-mc.

The fact that she moved away from her own roots in a geographical sense made her look back at them with a renewed interest. She started to get to grips with traditional song from Valencia "Cant d’estil" through singer-songwriter Josep Aparicio ‘Apa’ and went on to perform different television series' soundtracks too.

== Career ==
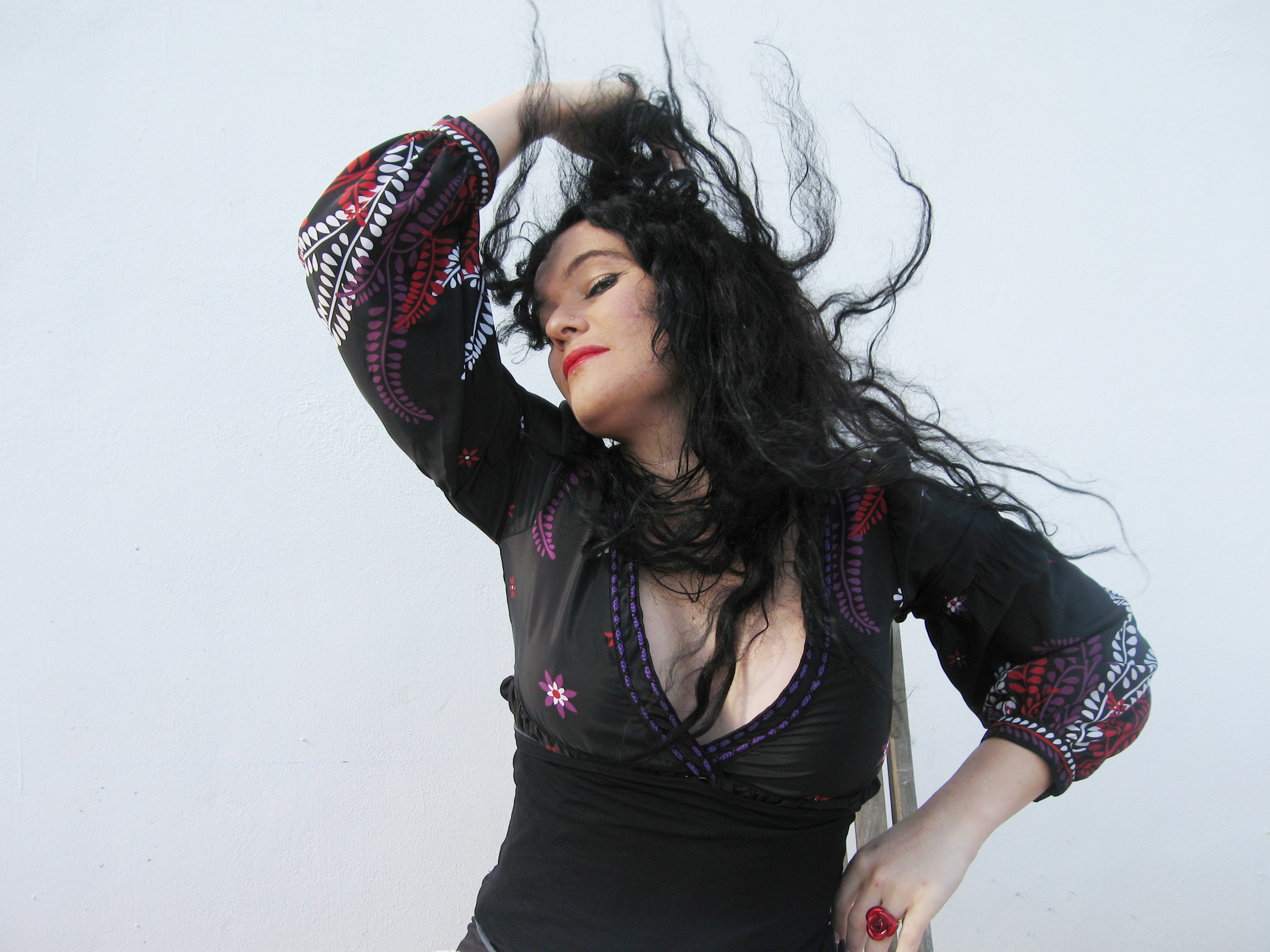
Singing a Sephardic song

In 1998 she put together the group L’Ham de Foc along with Éfren López; a project with Greek, Turkish, Balkan, Arab, Iranian, and Afghan influence, but with a strong Valencian identity. L’Ham de Foc went on to become one of the most internationally acclaimed Spanish groups at the time, bringing together a broad fan base from across the musical spectrum. They managed to reach a diverse audience; enthusiastic and loyal to a musical and artistic style that was different, authentic, adventurous, open and far removed from the conventions of folk, rock and pop. It developed into a unique timeless musical concept without trying to follow other trends. Their compositions grabbed the attention of art professionals and the public alike. Three albums were recorded between 1999 and 2006, all critically acclaimed: U, Cançó de Dona i Home, and Cor de Porc.

For two years on Channel 9 Radio-Si Radio in Valencia, she produced, directed and presented the programme Microkosmos dedicated to early and traditional music.

She played the lead in prestigious producer Pyrene's documentary programme Vinoleum dedicated to Caroig Massif, with photography and texts by Manuel Asensi and music by Joan Manuel Serrat and L’Ham de Foc.

In 2007 she embarked on a journey with Al Andaluz Project and brought together its three female vocalists: Sigrid Hausen, Iman Kandousi and Mara Aranda. They each represented three different musical heritages of the three cultures in Spain. The fruits of their efforts can be seen in Deus et Diabolus, Al Maraya and Abuab Al-andaluz, and includes a repertoire inspired by Central European, Sephardic and Andalusian cultures.

Mara has worked tirelessly and meticulously with such early music groups as Speculum Ensemble directed by Ernesto Schmied; Ensemble Oni Wytars directed by Michael Posch; and Ensemble Unicorn directed by Marco Ambrosini. Her work with Capella de Ministrers deserves special mention, putting together such works as Els Viatges de Tirant lo Blanch, The Circle of Life and Locked Music: Sefarad: compositio ns transmitted by oral tradition through the centuries in Turkey, Bulgaria, Morocco and Greece.

In February 2013 the much anticipated album "Sephardic Legacy" sees the light of day, a celebration of the music and song of the Sephardic Jews in the Eastern and Western Mediterranean.

Working with the group Solatge on a repertoire of traditional music from the historic territories of Aragon, the album Deria has won several awards: Best Folk Album 2009 COM "F"; Best Folk Album Catalunya Radio programme, Hydrogen; and several weeks in the WCME's prestigious ranking of Best Folk Music Groups in the World. Their second album Lo testament was released in October 2013 winning the award Best Folk Album 2013, again from COM.

Since January 2020 she serves as director of the International Centre of Medieval Music in Valencia.

== Discography ==
- Cendraires - "Cendraires" (Sonifolk, 1998)
- L'Ham de Foc - "U" (Sonifolk, 1999)
- L'Ham de Foc - "Cançó de Dona i Home" (Sonifolk, 2002)
- L'Ham de Foc - "Cor de Porc" (Galileo, 2005)
- Aman Aman - "Música i Cants Sefardís d´Orient i Occident"(Galileo, 2006)
- Al Andaluz project - "Deus et Diabolus" (Galileo, 2007)
- Mara Aranda & Solatge - "Dèria" (Galileo, 2009)
- Al-Andaluz Project - "Al Maraya" (Galileo, 2010)
- Artaica - "Nits cosies" (Temps Record, 2010)
- Abuab-Al Andaluz/Live in Munich (Galileo, 2011)
- Al Andaluz project - "Salam" (Galileo, 2013)
- Sephardic Legacy (Bureo músiques, 2013)
- Mara Aranda & Solatge - "Lo Testament" (Bureo músiques, 2013)
- "Mare Vostrum" (Picap, 2015)
- Sefarad en el Corazón de Marruecos (2016)
- Sefarad en el corazõn de Turquīa (2019)
- Sefarad en el corazõn de Grecia (2023)

== Collaborations ==
- David Cervera on his album Talaud (EMI-UPC, 2000). Tracks: Voramar and Nunat.
- Miquel Gil on his album Orgànic (Sonifolk, 2001). Tracks: Cançó dels traginers.
- Med'set Orkestra on their album Homónimo (2007). Tracks: La tarara y La puerta.
- Aljub+Krama on their album Afluències (Picap, 2009). Tracks: Mar de verí, L'olivera, Asteri and Taksidi.
- Luigi Cinque Project on their album Alentejo Story Concert (2009). Tracks: Yo me levantaría and El pandero.
- Aljub on their album Portes (Picap, 2010). Tracks: T'adormires a la meua ombra.
- Taray on their album Folkresort (Tres fronteras, 2010). Tracks: La candela.
- Capella de Ministrers on their album Els viatges de Tirant lo Blanch (2010). Tracks: Magnificat/Megalini.
- Obrint Pas on their album Coratge (2011). Tracks: Jota Valenciana and Al país de l'olivera.
- Capella de Ministrers on their album El Circle de la Vida (2012). Tracks: Epitafi de Sikilos.
- Capella de Ministrers on their album La cité des dames (2013). Tracks: 'Mareta'.
- Capella de Ministrers on their album La música encerrada (2014).
