= Victor Valderrabano =

Swiss orthopedic surgeon

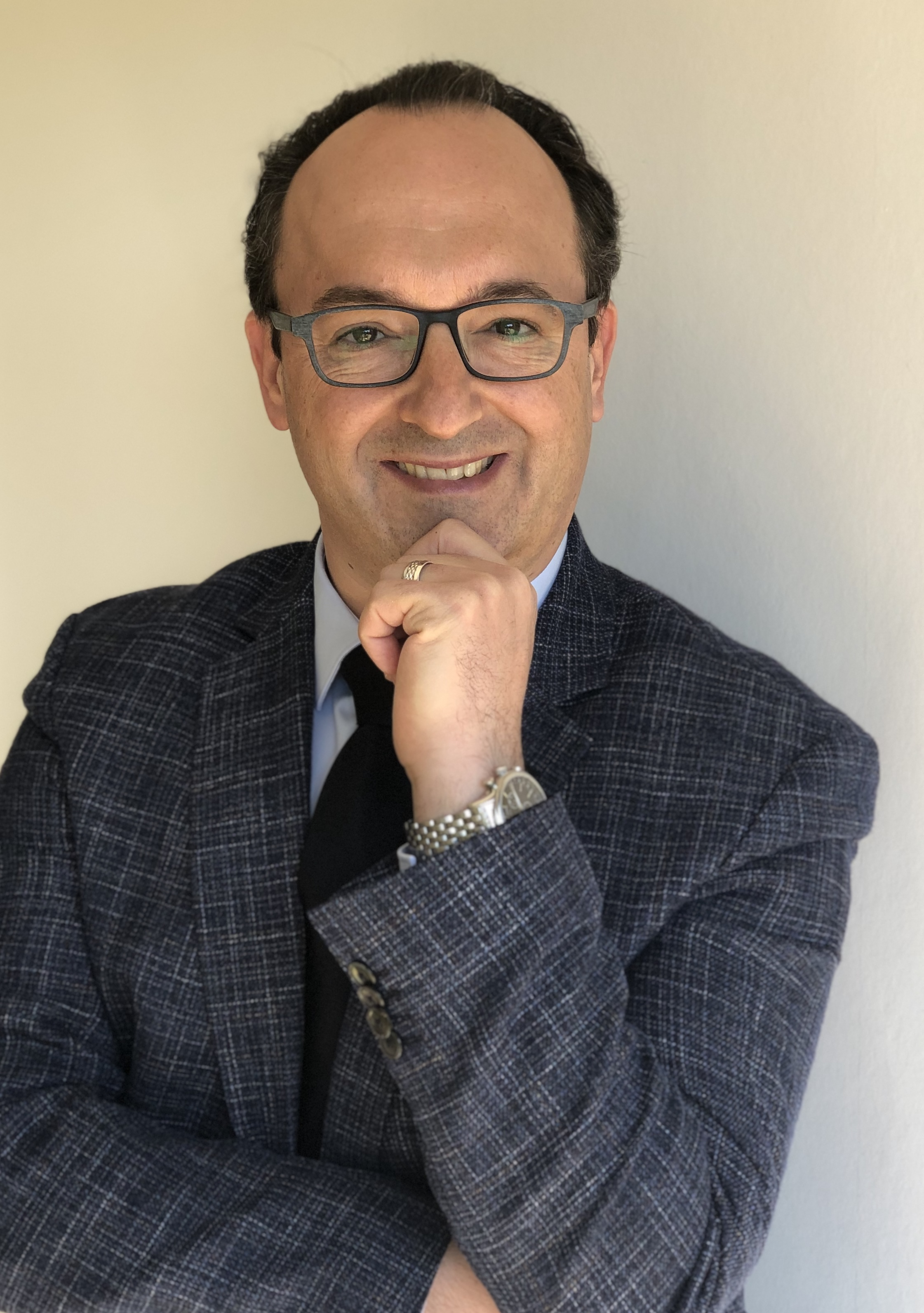
Victor Valderrabano

Victor Valderrabano (born 19 September 1972) is a Swiss orthopedic surgeon and traumatologist specializing in sports traumatology, osteoarthritis surgery and reconstructive surgery of the lower extremity.

== Career ==
Victor Valderrabano studied human medicine at the University of Zurich / Switzerland, where he received his doctorate in medicine. At the University of Calgary, he then completed a second PhD in biomechanics and osteoarthritis research. He did his residency/fellowship program at the Spital of Davos/Switzerland, Orthopaedic Department of the University Hospital of Basel/Switzerland and Orthopaedic Department of the University of Calgary/Canada, In 2006 he became a Swiss specialist in orthopaedic surgery and traumatology. In 2005, Valderrabano received the Certificate of Competence in Sports Medicine by the Swiss Society of Sports Medicine. In 2006, Valderrabano completed his habilitatation and was named an assistant professor at the Faculty of Medicine at the University of Basel/Switzerland for Orthopaedic and Traumatological Surgery and was appointed full professor of Orthopaedic and Traumatological Surgery in 2009. From 2009 to 2014, Valderrabano was chief physician/chairman of the Orthopaedic Department of the University Hospital Basel / Switzerland. Since January 2015, he is the Chairman of the SWISS ORTHO CENTER in Basel / Switzerland and Head of the Orthopaedic Traumatology Department of the Schmerzklinik Basel of the Swiss Medical Network SMN.

== Specialties and treatment focus ==
Victor Valderrabano is a specialist and international well-known surgeon in orthopaedic and traumatological surgery of the lower extremity (hip, knee, foot and ankle). His treatment focus also includes osteoarthritis surgery, joint preserving surgery (cartilage reconstruction, osteotomies), arthroplasty (joint replacement of hip, knee, ankle), sports orthopaedics, traumatology and the reconstruction of post-traumatic conditions. Among others Dario Cologna, Boris Becker, Victor Röthlin, Mame Diouf and Didier Ya Konan were treated by Valderrabano.

== Scientific achievements ==
Victor Valderrabano has published numerous scientific articles, clinical and scientific book chapters and books. His research interests include osteoarthritis, hip osteoarthritis, knee osteoarthritis, ankle osteoarthritis, total hip arthroplasty, total knee arthroplasty, total ankle arthroplasty, foot and ankle sports injuries, cartilage repair, tibialis posterior insufficiency, biomechanics, ankle instability, ankle arthroscopy, pedobarography and gait analysis. Valderrabano founded the Osteoarthritis Research Center Basel.
