= Gallimathias musicum =

1766 composition by W. A. Mozart

- Quodlibet by W. A. Mozart
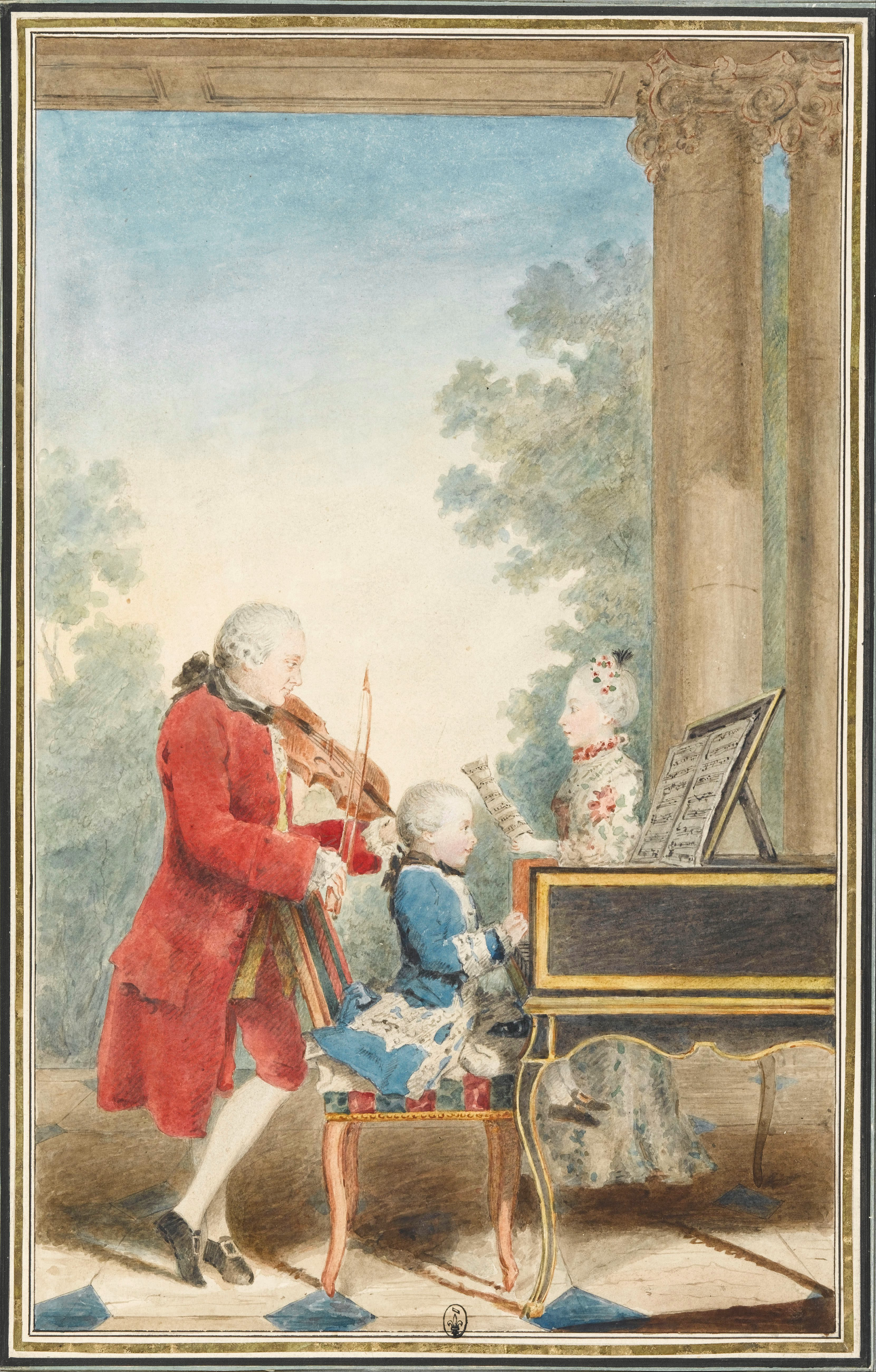
- Carmontelle's 1763–64 Mozart family portrait
- Other name: Galimathias musicum
- Catalogue: K. 32
- Language: German (8th movement only)
- Composed: March 1766
- Dedication: William V, Prince of Orange
- Duration: c. 16–20 minutes
- Movements: 17
- Scoring: Orchestra with continuo

Premiere
- Date: 11 March 1766
- Location: The Hague
- Conductor: Wolfgang Amadeus Mozart

Gallimathias musicum, (also spelled Galimathias musicum) K. 32, is a quodlibet composed in March 1766 by the ten-year-old Wolfgang Amadeus Mozart during his grand tour of Europe for festivities celebrating the installation of William V, Prince of Orange. It was first performed at The Hague on 11 March 1766. It was also performed on the family's journey back to Salzburg during a 12-day stopover in October 1766 in Donaueschingen. A typical performance of this piece lasts between 16 and 20 minutes.

== Instrumentation and structure ==
The work is scored for two oboes, two horns in D (and C and F), bassoon, mainly colla parte with double bass, harpsichord and strings. It consists of seventeen movements, with several lasting less than one minute:

1. Molto allegro in D major (13 bars)
2. Andante in D minor (18 bars)
3. Allegro in D major (16 bars)
4. Pastorella in G major (38 bars)
5. Allegro in D major (27 bars, attacca to VI)
6. Allegretto in A major (44 bars)
7. Allegro in D major (36 bars)
8. Molto adagio in G major "Eitelkeit!" (8 bars)
9. Allegro in C major (20 bars)
10. Largo in D minor (13 bars, attacca to XI)
11. Allegro in D major (12 bars)
12. Andante in F major (18 bars)
13. Allegro in E♭ major (harpsichord solo, 28 bars))
14. Menuet in F major (16 bars)
15. Adagio in D minor (21 bars)
16. Presto in D major (16 bars)
17. Fugue in F major (138 bars, no repeats)

A galimatias is a term for nonsense, gobbledygook, a hodgepodge. Not all instruments feature in every movement. No. 8, molto adagio, contains the lyrics, Eitelkeit! Eitelkeit! Ewig's Verderben! Wenn all's versoffen ist, gibts nichts zu erben. [Vanity! Vanity! Eternal ruin! When everything is boozed away, no inheritance is left.], for voices colla parte with violin I, violin II, viola, and bass.

The fugue, No. 17, is based on Mozart's iteration of Wilhelmus, a Dutch patriotic song that would later become the Netherlands' national anthem, as heard as the theme in his set of seven variations on it, K. 25 (March 1766).

== Discography ==
Below is an incomplete list of recordings:

Year	Conductor	Orchestra	Singers	Label	Format
1987	János Rolla	Franz Liszt Chamber Orchestra	-	Hungaroton	One track per movement
1990	-	Orpheus Chamber Orchestra	-	Deutsche Grammophon	Single uninterrupted track
1990	Neville Marriner	Academy of St Martin in the Fields	Ambrosian Singers	Philips Classics	Divided into tracks consisting of several movements
1998	Gunar Letzbor	Ars Antiqua Austria	St. Florian Boys' Choir	Chesky Records	One track per movement
2024	Vahan Mardirossian	Czech Philharmonic Chamber Orchestra	-	Brilliant Classics	One track per movement
