= Genolier Swiss Medical Network SA =

Swiss private hospital group

Swiss Medical Network SA
- Type: Private
- Headquarters: Genolier, Switzerland
- Number of locations: 19 (2026)
- Key people: Dino Cauzza (CEO); Raymond Loretan (Executive Chairman)
- Number of employees: 5000 (2026)
- Parent: Aevis Victoria SA
- Website: http://www.swissmedical.net

Swiss Medical Network is a Swiss private hospital group with clinics and medical centres in all language regions of the country. Swiss Medical Network is a subsidiary of AEVIS VICTORIA SA, which is listed on the SIX Swiss Exchange. Aevis holds 80% of Swiss Medical Network. The holding company is active in the healthcare, life sciences, medical care, hotel and personal services sectors.

== Field of activity ==
Swiss Medical Network is one of the two leading private clinic and hospital groups in Switzerland. Swiss Medical Network employs 2,300 doctors and 4,100 staff in 19 clinics and hospitals and over 80 outpatient centres in 16 cantons and all language regions of the country. he Group covers the entire medical spectrum and manages list and contract hospitals. The facilities have a total of around 1,500 beds and carried out more than 90,000 surgical procedures in 2024. In total, over 1,177,000 patients received outpatient care. Swiss Medical Network was the majority shareholder in Hôpital du Jura bernois SA before it became part of the Réseau de l’Arc healthcare organisation

The network is complemented by an ophthalmology reference network, the Swiss Visio Network, with over 22 centres throughout Switzerland. wiss Visio specialises in refractive surgery and ophthalmology and is internationally renowned for its research in the field of glaucoma.

In 2022, Swiss Medical Network launched the Réseau de l'Arc, the first integrated healthcare organisation with its own healthcare product called VIVA, together with Visana Participations and the Canton of Berne. s part of this integrated strategy, Swiss Medical Network is focussing on primary healthcare in the periphery. The network now includes over 80 medical centres, including the Xundheitszentren, which extend from Stein am Rhein to Silvaplana. In autumn 2024, it was announced that the Swiss Medical Network had established a new integrated care region in Ticino. This coincided with the integration of the Centromedico centres. In January 2025, the region was successfully launched under the name Rete Sant'Anna. The Swiss Medical Network also integrated Zofingen Hospital, thereby launching its third integrated care region, the Aare Network.

| Clinics that belong to the Swiss Medical Network | Foundation year | Year of joining Swiss Medical Network | Medical specialities |
|---|---|---|---|
| Clinique de Genolier | 1972 | 2002 | Oncology, orthopaedic surgery, neurosurgery, general and visceral surgery |
| Clinique de Montchoisi | 1935 | 2003 | Ophthalmology, orthopaedic surgery, ENT, radiology |
| Clinique de Valère | 1920 | 2012 | Orthopaedic surgery, general surgery, gastroenterology |
| Clinique Générale Ste-Anne | 1908 | 2005 | Orthopaedic surgery, sports medicine, gynaecology |
| Clinique Générale-Beaulieu | 1899 | 2016 | Orthopaedic surgery, gynaecology and obstetrics, urology, oncology, nuclear medicine, radio-oncology |
| Clinique Montbrillant | 1909 | 2015 | Orthopaedic surgery, gynaecology, ophthalmology |
| Clinique Valmont | 1905 | 2006 | Neurological rehabilitation, orthopaedic rehabilitation, peripheral neurological rehabilitation, respiratory rehabilitation, memory clinic |
| Hôpital de La Providence | 1859 | 2012 | Sports medicine, orthopaedic surgery, urology |
| Hôpital de Moutier | 1850 | 2020 | Gynaecology, internal medicine, mental health |
| Hôpital de Saint-Imier | 1850 | 2020 | Surgery, internal medicine, emergency medicine, geriatric rehabilitation |
| Privatklinik Bethanien | 1912 | 2010 | Orthopaedics, spinal surgery, gynaecology, urology |
| Privatklinik Belair | 1971 | 2019 | Orthopaedics, general and visceral surgery, urology |
| Privatklinik Lindberg | 1906 | 2011 (The clinic will cease operations in 2026.) | Orthopaedic surgery, neurosurgery, urology |
| Privatklinik Obach | 1922 | 2012 | General surgery, gynaecology, internal medicine, urology |
| Privatklinik Siloah | 1955 | 2018 | Orthopaedic surgery, general surgery, urology |
| Privatklinik Villa im Park | 1984 | 2013 | Gynaecology and obstetrics, orthopaedic surgery, urology |
| Rosenklinik Rapperswil | 1995 | 2019 | Orthopaedics, hand surgery, urology, sports medicine |
| Schmerzklinik Basel | 1978 | 2014 | Anaesthesia, interventional pain diagnostics, rheumatology, neurology |
| Klinik Pyramide am See | 1993 | 2011 (The clinic ceased operations in 2024.) | Plastic and reconstructive surgery, breast cancer surgery |
| Clinica Ars Medica | 1989 | 2012 | Orthopaedic surgery, sports medicine, physiotherapy |
| Clinica Sant’Anna | 1922 | 2012 | Gynaecology and obstetrics, oncology, ENT |

== History ==
Five shareholders founded AGEN Holding SA in 2002 by taking over Clinique de Genolier, which had been operating in the Vaud municipality of the same name since 1972. In the years that followed, new clinics were continuously integrated into the group in order to create a national network of private healthcare institutions. In 2003, they integrated the Clinique de Montchoisi in Lausanne, VD, which had been founded in 1923. The Clinique Valmont in Glion ob Montreux, VD, founded by Henri-Auguste Widmer in 1905, and the Sainte-Anne and Garcia clinics in Fribourg were integrated in 2005 (the merger of the latter two ultimately resulted in the Clinique Générale Ste-Anne). In 2007, the Centre d'oncologie in Geneva, the only private centre for radio-oncology in the city, was opened.

AGEN Holding changed its name to Genolier Swiss Medical Network SA in 2008 and integrated the Centre médico-chirurgical des Eaux-Vives in Geneva the following year and Privatklinik Bethanien in Zurich, founded in 1912, in 2010.

In 2011, Genolier Swiss Medical Network acquired a 49% stake in Privatklinik Lindberg in Winterthur ] and a 20% stake in Klinik Pyramide am See in Zurich. [ ] Privatklinik Obach in Solothurn (founded in 1922), Clinica Ars Medica in Gravesano TI (founded in 1989), Clinica Sant'Anna in Lugano (founded in 1922) and Privatklinik Lindberg were integrated in 2012 and Clinique de Valère in Sion, VS (founded in 1920), Hôpital de la Providence in Neuchâtel (founded in 1859) and Privatklinik Villa im Park in Rothrist (founded in 1984) in 2013. [ This was followed in 2014 by the integration of Schmerzklinik Basel (founded in 1978) and in 2015 by the integration of Clinique Montbrillant in La Chaux-de-Fonds.

After 2015, the company changed its name to Swiss Medical Network SA to emphasise its commitment throughout Switzerland. The renowned Clinique Générale-Beaulieu joined the network in 2016 to further promote oncology and radio-oncology in Geneva. In German-speaking Switzerland, the Privatklinik Siloah in Gümligen (BE) followed in 2018, the Rosenklinik Rapperswil in 2019 and the Privatklinik Belair also in 2019.

In January 2020, it was announced that the Government Council of the Canton of Berne was selling 35% of the share capital of the Hôpital du Jura Bernois (HJB SA) hospital group to Swiss Medical Network. The hospital group operates the hospitals in Moutier and Saint-Imier, among others. On 30 August 2021, the stake was increased by a further 17% to 52%. The former Hôpital du Jura Bernois was renamed Réseau de l'Arc. The first integrated healthcare centre in Switzerland. On 12 December 2024, it was announced that Zofingen Hospital, a subsidiary of Kantonsspital Aarau AG, would become part of the Swiss Medical Network from 12 December 2024.[20][21][22]

== Primary sources ==
- Official website
