= Michael Navarrus =

Spanish composer

Miguel Navarro, known in Latin as Michael Navarrus (Pamplona, 1563 – Pamplona, 2 January 1627) was a Spanish composer.
