= Carles Magraner =

Spanish musician (born 1962)

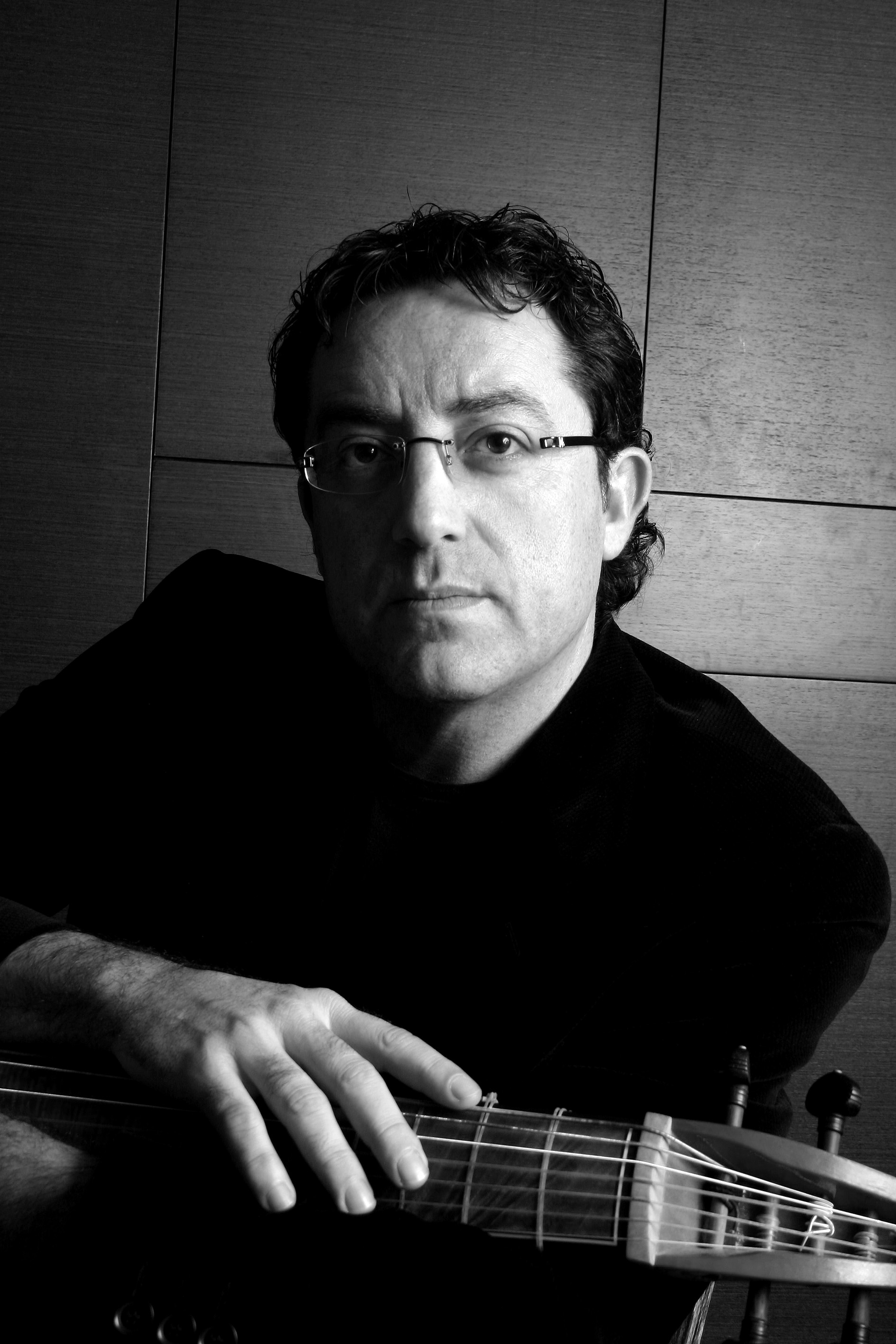

Background information
- Born: November 16, 1962 (age 62); Almussafes
- Instruments: cello and viola da gamba

Carles Magraner is a Spanish musician. He was born on November 16, 1962, in Almussafes (province of Valencia) and studied music at Carcaixent, the Conservatorio Superior de Valencia (cello and musicology), Conservatoire Toulouse and Amsterdam (viola de arco). He is a professor of cello and viola da gamba, though most of his professional work is done with the group Capella de Ministrers, which he founded in Valencia in 1987 and of which he is still director.
