= Mystery Play of Elche =

Cultural property in Elche, Spain

Coordinates: 38°16′01″N 0°41′54″W

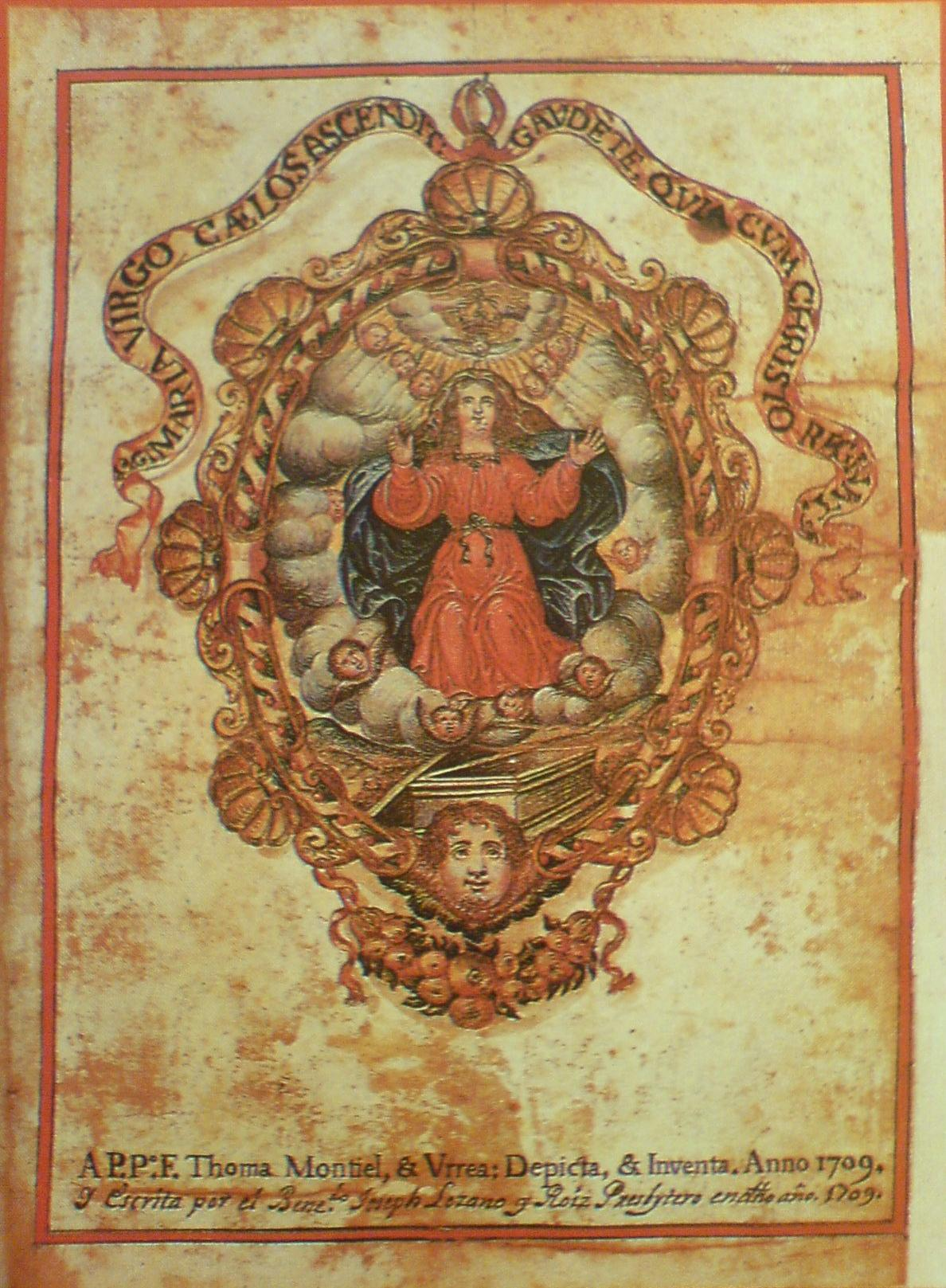
- Frontispiece of the 1709 Consueta, or manuscript of the Misteri that contains the dialogue and score.
- Dates: 14 and 15 August
- Frequency: Annual
- Venue: Basílica de Santa Maria
- Locations: Elche, Alicante (Valencian Community, Spain)

Fiesta of International Tourist Interest
- Designated: 1980

Mystery Play of Elche
- UNESCO Intangible Cultural Heritage
- Country: Spain
- Reference: 00018
- Region: Europe and North America

Inscription history
- Inscription: 2008 (3rd session)
- List: Representative

The Mystery Play of Elche or Elche Mystery Play (Valencian: Misteri d'Elx [misˈtɛɾi ˈðɛʎtʃ]; Spanish: Misterio de Elche [misˈteɾjo ð(e) ˈeltʃe]), is a liturgical drama from the Middle Ages that reenacts the Dormition and Assumption of the Blessed Virgin Mary.

The two-act mystery play is performed annually on 14 and 15 August in the Basílica de Santa María in the city of Elche (Elx). In 2001, UNESCO declared it one of the Masterpieces of the Oral and Intangible Heritage of Humanity and, in 2008, inscribed it on its Representative List.

== Origins ==
Two stories exist regarding the date of creation of the Misteri d'Elx. The older account, which placed its origin in the 13th century, was put forth by Cristobal Sanz in his history of the city written at the beginning of the 17th century. After confessing that he was unable to prove his history, he proposed that the earliest inhabitants of the city had celebrated it in 1276. He also adds another older story: after the conquest of the city by James I the Conqueror in 1265, the inhabitants of the city conceived the idea of a mystery play on the day the city was retaken from the Moors.

In 1717, José Antón, Attorney General of the Marquisate of Elche, also supported the theory and added a miraculous element: the arrival of a mysterious ark on the beaches of Elche in May 1266. The strange box contained the image of the Virgin of the Assumption still enshrined in the Basilica, and the Consueta, a document containing the script and occasionally the music of the play. This story was maintained in part to excuse a possible mistake of the composer, Óscar Esplá (1886–1976), who asserted that in 1924, he had been shown a letter of 1266 authorizing the play. This letter was allegedly preserved in the Municipal Archives of Elche, despite the fact that it has never been seen since or even cited. The work carried out by Esplá, and his importance as a composer, revived the theory of the play's origin in the 13th century.

Since the end of the 19th century when historians first arrived at Elche and studied the play, the date of its composition was given a terminus ante quem of around the turn of 15th century. At present, most scholars from multiple disciplines (literary, theatrical, musical, linguistics, iconography, etc.) agree to a composition date of the latter half of the 15th century, without emphasizing any precedents in existence in the city.

== Scene ==
The play is performed entirely within the Basilica, and the stage comprises several areas and devices:

=== The Heaven ===
The great linen, located at the height of the ring of the Basilica dome, has the double function of representing the sky and concealing mechanisms for the ascent and descent of aerial stage devices. It is possibly as old as the current play, since stage directions from as early as 1530 already seem to indicate its presence.

The linen acts as a divider between celestial and earthly actions, and possesses a peephole towards the choir called the "Door to Heaven". The Door is a square aperture that is opened and closed three times during the play in order to admit aerial stage devices.

=== La Magrana ===
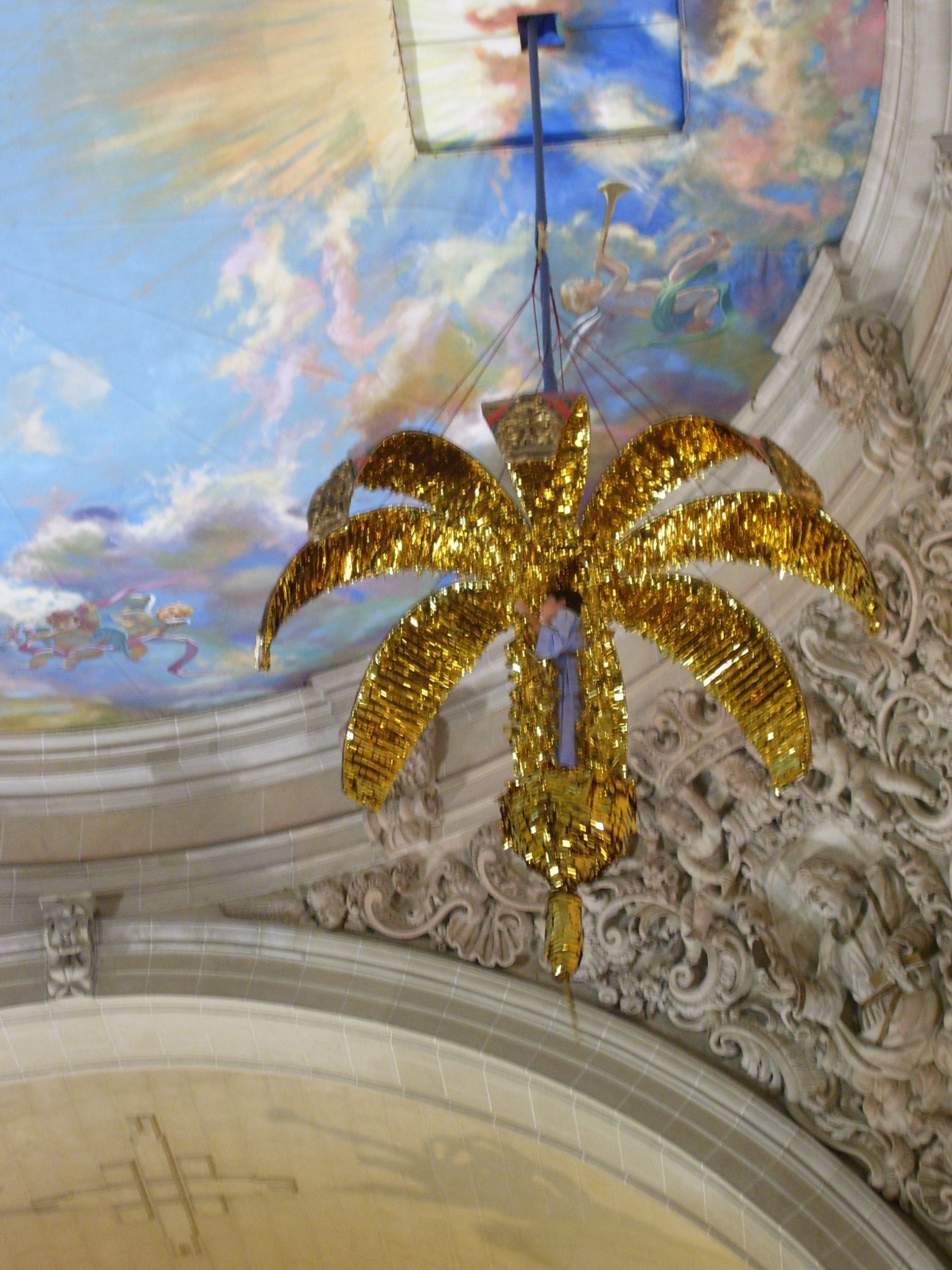
La Magrana partway through the Door to Heaven during La Vespra.

This aerial device, called la magrana ("the pomegranate"), transports the first Angel who delivers the golden palm frond to Mary, and shows her the way to Heaven. In its current form, the device dates the second half of the 16th century. Both its structure and its name are reminiscent of period mechanisms commonly used in Spain, such as boxes, globes, and armillary spheres.

Until recently, the term "pomegranate" was thought to be quite modern, with the term "cloud" considered to be more ancient and correct. This was thought to have been the result of the device's supposedly having changed in colour from an older blue to red. Modern research, however, suggests that the name was already used in the 16th century, possibly because the current, more compact and sturdy device replaced a less substantial structure made of cotton, paper, and fabric.

=== The Araceli ===
The Araceli is the second aerial device to appear, and enters the scene twice. It is first used by five angels who fetch Mary's soul (in the form of a statuette) to Heaven; four of the angels sing as the central angel (often a priest) bears the Virgin's spirit. They appear to the Apostles, who organize a procession to bury her body. Its second appearance is in the grand finale, where the fifth angel with Mary's soul is replaced by the statue of Mary. This image is taken up to the Heaven then crowned by the Holy Trinity at the halfway point of its ascension.

The Araceli is not unique to the play. It is similar to sculptures made at the end of the 15th century and the beginning of the 16th.

=== Cadafal ===
This is the platform on which much of the drama takes place. Roughly square in shape and covered in wood, it is raised to conceal a hollow beneath into which some aerial devices descend, where actors change costumes, or disappear into. It is located under the dome and the Heaven, but extends in part into the choir to connect the Sepulchre with the shaft of the Door of Heaven.

In Elche, the Cadafal is, in words of Quirante Santacruz, "Mary's area, which contains the places that are hers exclusively, her house and her tomb. Here, the Virgin experiences all the process of sacralization and glorification that contains the work, it is the only place where celestial personages and earthly people live together".

The term "cadafal"appears in early reports of mystery plays staged inside churches with an invariable meaning: a dais or platform where the dramatic action takes place.

=== The Corridor ===
This is the great ramp built on the Basilica's main aisle. It rises from the principal door to the Cadafal; two small bays to the each side at the point where it joins the latter provide seating for three lay organisers and the priest overseeing the play.

Its importance is largely symbolic, primarily because it is the only physical element that converts the entire church into a framework for dramatic actions. Second, the walkway is the road that permits communication between the earthly and the divine, and represents the spiritual path everyone travels.

During the play, the young actor playing Mary also travels this path, from the Basilica door to the Cadafal, symbolising the Virgin's total achievement of the Christian ideal of unity with Christ through his Passion.

== Music ==
The music for the play is contained in the Consueta, a portmanteau of the words Consuetudine and Ordinatio. The manuscripts of the liturgical ceremonies, which contain precious annotations on stage directions, devices, and the musical score, date to as early as 1625.

== Performances ==
=== Normal ===
August 14 is when the first act, known as La Vesprà ("The Vigil") is performed. As it is the Vigil of the Assumption, it recounts the final hours and Dormition of the Virgin, when her soul is brought to Heaven and her remaining corpse surrounded by the grieving Apostles.

August 15 is when the second act, known as La Festa ("The Feast") is staged. It focuses on the burial, Assumption and Coronation of the Virgin. It begins at 10 o'clock with El Soterrar ("The Interment"), which takes place in the streets outside the Basilica with a procession of the image of the dead Virgin, the other actors, and bands playing songs of La Festa.

==== Preparations ====
In the weeks leading to the staging of the Misteri, several preparatory events occur.

On August 6, in the civic Room of the council, La prova de veus ("the test of voices") takes place to select those who will sing in the Misteri. This shows that Elche's City Council, and not the Church, financially supports the play.

At 6 o'clock in the evening of August 10, La prova de l'àngel ("the test of the angel") is conducted inside the Basilica. This is when organizers identify children resistant to dizziness, and thus fit to descend and ascend on the aerial stage devices.

=== Extraordinary ===
From 11 to 13 August, the so-called Assajos generals or extraordinary representations, take place as rehearsals for the actual event.

== Antisemitism ==
The play has been criticized for its viciously medieval negative portrayals of Jews. Critic David Nirenberg asked whether the sponsors ought to remove the racist material as actors in the Oberammergau Passion Play have done, and pointing out that the play, which was broadcast on Facebook for the first time in 2019, violates the platform's hate speech policies.

== See also ==
- Easter drama
- N-Town Plays, revived as the Lincoln Mystery Plays
- Liturgical drama
- Oberammergau Passion Play
- Nativity play
- Passion play
- Passion Play of Iztapalapa
- York Mystery Plays
