= Cancionero de Upsala =

1556 volume of mostly anonymous Spanish music

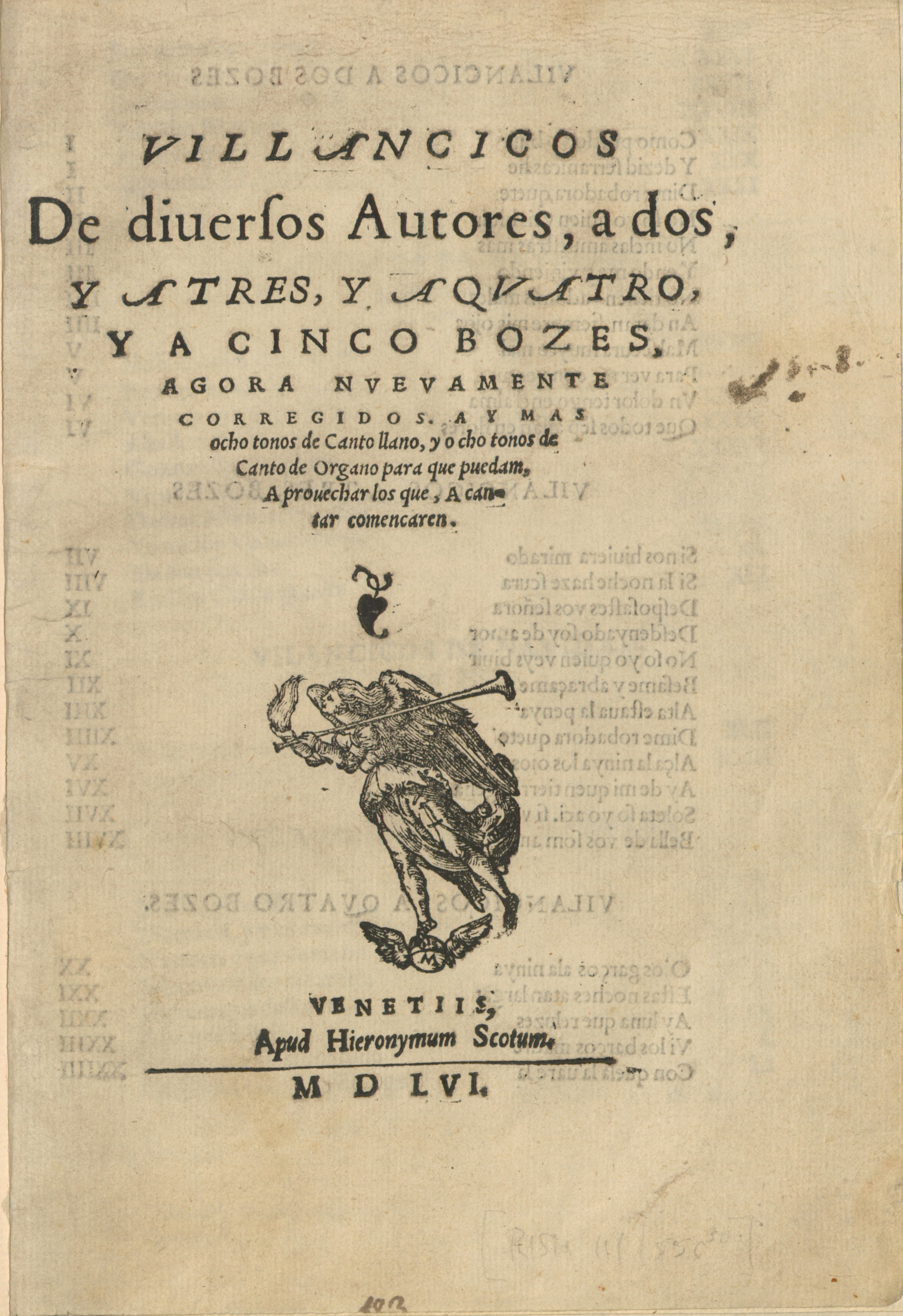
- Cancionero de Upsala title page
- Authors: Juan del Encina; Cristóbal de Morales; Mateo Flecha el Viejo; Nicolas Gombert; et al
- Original title: Villancicos de diuersos autores a dos, y a tres, y a qvatro, y a cinco bozes, agora nvevamente corregidos. Ay mas ocho tonos de canto llano, y ocho tonos de canto de organo para que puedam, a prouechar los que, a cantar comencaren
- Language: Spanish
- Genre: Spanish renaissance music
- Publisher: Girolamo Scotto
- Publication date: 1556
- Publication place: Venice, Italy
- Pages: LXIIII
- Text: Cancionero de Upsala at Choral Public Domain Library
- Website: http://urn.kb.se/resolve?urn=urn:nbn:se:alvin:portal:record-55063

The Cancionero de Upsala [sic], also known by the titles Cancionero del Duque de Calabria and Cancionero de Venecia, is a volume of mostly anonymous Spanish music printed in Venice in 1556. Its actual title is Villancicos de diversos Autores, a dos, y a tres, y a quatro, y a cinco bozes, agora nuevamente corregidos. Ay mas ocho tonos de Canto llano, y ocho tonos de Canto de Organo para que puedan aprovechar los que A cantar començaren. Venetiis, Apud Hieronymum Scotum, MDLVI.

== Modern history ==
The sole copy known to exist was rediscovered in Carolina Rediviva's music collections at Uppsala University Library in 1906 by Spanish diplomat and music scholar Rafael Mitjana (1869–1921).

It was edited in 1909 by Mitjana; the subsequent literature has mostly adopted his spelling "Upsala" ("Upsala" being the historic Swedish spelling of "Uppsala" until the major spelling reform of 1906).

In 1913 the book was bound by bookbinder to the Royal Court of Sweden Gustaf Hedberg at Mitjana's cost.

A facsimile was first published by Alamire (Peer, Belgium 1984) and later by the Biblioteca Valenciana (Valencia, Spain 2003).

== Contents ==
| No. | Title | Composer |

=== Villancicos a dos bozes (for two voices) ===
| 1. | Como puedo yo bivir | Anonymous |
| 1b. | Y decid serranicas, he | Anonymous |
| 2. | Dime, robadora ¿que te mereci? | Anonymous |
| 2b. | No soy yo quien veis bivir | Anonymous |
| 3. | No me los amuestres más | Anonymous |
| 3b. | Yéndome y viniendo | Anonymous |
| 4. | No tienen vado mis males | Juan del Encina |
| 4b. | Andarán siempre mis ojos | Gabriel Mena? |
| 5. | Mal se cura muyto mal | Anonymous |
| 5b. | Para verme con ventura | Juan del Encina |
| 6. | Un dolor tengo en ell' alma | Anonymous |
| 6b. | Que todos se pasan en flores | Anonymous |

=== Villancicos a tres bozes (for three voices) ===
| 7. | Si no os hubiera mirado | Cristóbal de Morales |
| 8. | Si la noche haze escura | Anonymous |
| 9. | Desposastes os, Señora | Anonymous |
| 10. | Desdeñado soy de amor | Anonymous |
| 11. | No so yo quien veys bivir | Anonymous |
| 12. | Vésame y abraçame | Anonymous |
| 13. | Alta estava la peña | Anonymous |
| 14. | Dime robadora ¿que te mereci? | Anonymous |
| 15. | Alça la niña los ojos | Anonymous |
| 16. | Ay de mi qu'en tierra agena | Anonymous |
| 17. | Soleta so jo açí | Bartomeu Càrceres? |
| 18. | Vella de vós som amoros | Mateo Flecha el Viejo |

=== Villancicos a quatro bozes (for four voices) ===
| 19. | Ojos garços a la niña | Francisco Guerrero? / Juan del Encina? |
| 20. | Estas noches a tan largas | Anonymous |
| 21. | Ay luna que reluzes! | Anonymous |
| 22. | Vi los barcos, madre | Anonymous |
| 23. | ¿Con qué la lavaré? | Anonymous |
| 24. | Soy serranica, y vengo d'Estremadura | Anonymous |
| 25. | Si te vas a bañar, Juanilla | Anonymous |
| 26. | Tan mala noche (Serrana, donde dormistes?) | Anonymous |
| 27. | Falalalán, falalalera de la guarda riera | Bartomeu Càrceres? / Mateo Flecha el Viejo? |
| 28. | Ah, Pelayo, que desmayo! | Juan Aldomar? |
| 29. | Que farem del pobre Joan | Mateo Flecha el Viejo |
| 30. | Teresica hermana | Mateo Flecha el Viejo |

=== Villancicos de Navidad a quatro bozes (Christmas villancicos for four voices) ===
| 31. | No la devemos dormir (La Noche Sancta) | Anonymous |
| 32. | Rey a quien reyes adoran | Anonymous |
| 33. | Verbum caro factum est | Mateo Flecha el Viejo? |
| 34. | Alta Reyna soberana | Anonymous |
| 35. | Gózate, Virgen sagrada | Anonymous |
| 36. | Un niño nos es nasçido | Anonymous |
| 37. | Dadme albricias, hijos d'Eva | Anonymous |
| 38. | Yo me soy la morenica | Anonymous |
| 39. | E la don don, Verges Maria | Mateo Flecha el Viejo? / Bartomeu Càrceres? |
| 40. | Riu, riu, chiu | Mateo Flecha el Viejo |

=== Villancicos de Navidad a tres bozes (Christmas villancicos for three voices) ===
| 41. | Señores, el qu'es nasçido | Pedro de Pastrana? |
| 42. | Vos, Virgen, soys nuestra Madre | Anonymous |

=== Villancicos a cinco bozes (for five voices) ===
| 43. | Dezilde al cavallero que non se quexe | Nicolas Gombert |
| 44. | Dizen a mi que los amores hé | Anonymous |
| 45. | Si amores me han de matar | Mateo Flecha el Viejo |
| 46. | Si de vos mi bien me aparto, ¿Que harè? | Anonymous |
| 47. | Hartaos ojos de llorar | Anonymous |
| 48. | Falai, meus olhos, si me quereis beñy | Anonymous |
