= Diego Pisador =

Spanish vihuelist and composer

Diego Pisador (1509/10? – after 1557) was a Spanish vihuelist and composer of the Renaissance.

== Life ==
Little is known of the details of Pisador's life, not even the exact dates of his birth and death. It is known that he was born in Salamanca around the years 1509 or 10. He was the oldest son of Alonso Pisador and Isabel Ortiz, who married in 1508. Ortiz's father, Alfonso III of Fonseca, Archbishop of Santiago, was a great patron of music. Alonso Pisador worked as a notary in the audience of the archbishop and, in 1524, he moved to Toledo, following his steps. There he entered the service of the count of Monterrey, possibly Alonso de Acevedo y Zúñiga, who was also a grandson of Alfonso III. In 1526 Pisador took minor orders, but did not continue in an ecclesiastical career.

In 1532, his father moved to Galicia following Alonso de Acevedo y Zúñiga as the corregidor of Monterrey. He would not return to Salamanca until 1551, after his wife died in September 1550. He settled in Salamanca in the care of his mother and his younger brother. He had charge of the economic affairs of the family and the position of majordomo/administrator in the city of Salamanca, once held by his father.

At the death of his mother, Diego inherited the lion's share of the family fortune, which upset his younger brother. Initially, the father sided with Diego in this dispute, but he threatened to marry and abandon his work on the book of vihuela music which had occupied him up to then. When the father returned to Salamanca a short time later, he had a change of opinion, supported the other brother, and forced Diego to leave the family home. It is known that in 1553, Diego sold the house and that in 1557 father and son were still at odds.

== Libro de música de vihuela ==
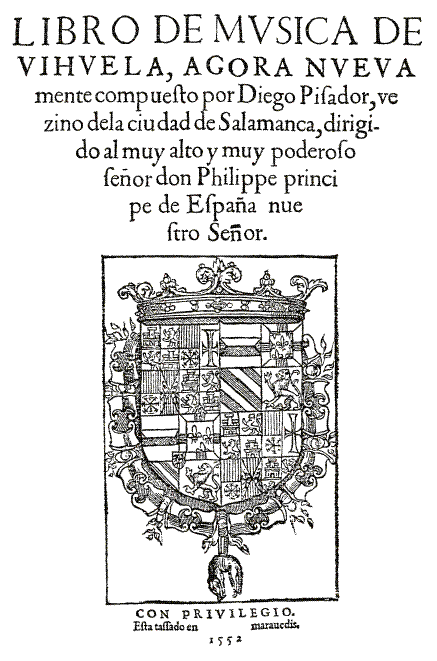
Title page of Libro de música de vihuela

In 1552, he published a book of works for vihuela titled Libro de música de vihuela, dedicated to Philip II of Spain. It is divided into 7 books and consists of 95 pieces, although if one considers, as Pisador did, each one of the parts of the compositions as a separate work, the book contains a total of 186 pieces. Pisador worked on the book for six years. 58 of the 95 are for voice and vihuela, and 37 are for vihuela solo.

As was common at the time, many of the works are transcriptions (or intabulations) for vihuela of works by other composers such as Juan Vásquez, Juan García de Basurto, Mateo Flecha el viejo, Josquin des Prez, Nicolas Gombert, Adrian Willaert, Jean Mouton, Jacques Arcadelt, V. Fontana and Costanzo Festa.

== Bibliography ==
- Rubio, Samuel (1983), Historia de la música española. Vol 2. Desde el Ars Nova hasta 1600, pp. 227–229, Madrid: Alianza Editorial. 84-206-6474-X.
- Reese, Gustave. Music in the Renaissance. Norton, 1954.
- Pisador, Diego, Libro de musica de vihuela, Genève : Minkoff Reprint, 1973. ISBN 2-8266-0125-3 Reimpression de l'edition de Salamanque, 1552.
- Roa, Francisco, Gértrudix, Felipe (2003), El libro de música de vihuela de Diego Pisador, (3 vols.), Pygmalión. 84-84556-156546-N. Includes facsimile, study, and transcription.
