= Pere Rabassa =

Catalan composer and musicologist

Pere Rabassa (Catalan pronunciation: ['peɾə rə'βasə]; (Spanish: Pedro Rabassa) (Barcelona 1683 - Seville, 12 December 1767) was a Catalan composer and musicologist.

== Life and career ==
He received early music lessons from his uncle, Ramon Rabassa, an organist, and voice training at the choir of the Cathedral of Santa Eulalia, Barcelona. The maestro de capilla till he was 13 was Joan Barter, and then the more famous Francisco Valls. During this period music in Barcelona was Italianized due to the presence of the court of Archduke Charles of Austria (later Charles VI, Holy Roman Emperor) for the duration of the War of the Spanish Succession (1702–1713).

Rabassa took holy orders and in 1713 was appointed maestro de capilla at the Cathedral of Vic, though, perhaps as punishment for Austrian sympathies, he moved on to the Cathedral of Valencia (24 May 1714 – 1724) and Cathedral of Seville (1724–1767). During his long tenure in Seville he enlarged the capilla with addition of 4 violins, 2 violas, 2 oboes and 1 flute (1730–1740).

== Works ==
His main pedagogical text was Guia Para los Principiantes que dessean Perfeycionarse en la Compossicion de la Mussica (1726).

Of over 400 known compositions, over 300 survive.

- 44 masses
- 83 psalms
- 110 villancicos

Listing on Catalan Wikipedia

== Discography ==
- Miserere. Miserere. Attendite Populi. O vos Omnes. Nunc Dimitis. Accepit Jesus Calicem. Coro "Juan Navarro Hispalensis" dir. Josep Cabré. Almaviva DS-0135 December 2001
- Requiem. "Missa Defunctorum for royal funerals 8 voices, 2 violins, 2 flute and basso continuo" Harmonia del Parnàs. dir. Marian Rosa Montagut, La mà de guido. Ref.: LMG2076
- Et in Terra Pax Misa Simeon Justus Onofri OBS
