= Bartomeu Càrceres =

Spanish composer

Bartomeu Càrceres (Valencian pronunciation: [bəɾtuˈmɛu ˈkaɾsəɾəs]), Bartolomé Cárceres in Castilian, (fl. 1546) was a Spanish composer, notably of ensaladas.

== Biography ==
The sole verifiable biographical fact known about him is the record in 1546 of a payment of 72 ducats to him as "carrier of the books" to the capella of the Duke of Calabria, Fernando de Aragón. His salary was half that of the maestro de capilla, Juan de Cepa. Manuscript M1166-M1967 of the Biblioteca de Catalunya includes works by both Càrceres and Cepa. For example, the villancico Soleta y verge, an adaptation of a secular song from the Cancionero de Upsala appears in a version for three voices by Càrceres and a variation developed from this for five voices with refrain by Cepa.

== Works ==
Sacred works

- Missa de desponsatione beatae Mariae
- Elegit sibi Dominus
- Vias tuas, Domine
- Lamentation Lamech - O vos omnes

Secular works

- Al jorn del judici
- Soleta yo so / Soleta y verge
- Falalalanlera
- Toca Juan tu rabelejo
- Remedio del primer padre
- Nunca tal cosa se vio
- ensalada: La trulla ("Hubbub")

== Recordings ==
- Bartomeu Càrceres - Villancicos & Ensaladas. Jordi Savall
- Bartomeu Càrceres - Ensaladas. Capella de Ministrers, 2011
