= Jorge Rabassa =

Jorge Oscar Rabassa (born 1948) is an Argentine geomorphologist and Quaternary geologist. He is a professor at National University of Tierra del Fuego and director of the CONICET. He is member of the National Academy of Sciences of Argentina since 2012. From 1998 to 2002 he served as rector of the National University of Comahue.
