= Enríquez de Valderrábano =

Spanish composer

Enríquez de Valderrábano (c. 1500 – after 1557) was a Spanish vihuelist and composer. There is little biographical data on this composer of early music, but his Libro de música de vihuela intitulado Silva de Sirenas, published in Valladolid, Spain, in 1547, states he is a citizen of Peñaranda de Duero, and the book is dedicated to Francisco de Zúñiga, the Fourth Count of Miranda. This dedication is probably the source of Juan Bermudo's unconfirmed assertion in his Declaración de instrumentos musicales of 1555 that Valderrábano was employed by the count.

Valderrábano's book of music has seven parts containing fugas, contrapuntos, sonetos, bajas, vacas, discantes, pavanas, proverbios, canciones, romances, and villancicos—ordered by level of difficulty. It includes pieces for two vihuelas, for vihuela and another instrument, and for vihuela and voice.

Valderrábano's book is considered an important source of knowledge on the vihuela music of the Spanish Renaissance of the sixteenth century and European instrumental music in general, as it includes transcriptions of pieces by other significant composers of the time, including Cristóbal de Morales, Josquin des Prez, Nicolas Gombert, Philippe Verdelot, Jorge Báez de Sepúlveda, Adrian Willaert, Vincenzo Ruffo, Diego Ortiz, Juan Vásquez, and Jean Mouton.
