= Miguel de Fuenllana =

Spanish composer

"Fantasía" from book IV of Orphenica Lyra, played by Gerardo Acuña

Miguel de Fuenllana (c.1500–1579) was a Spanish vihuelist and composer of the Renaissance.

== Biography ==
Little is known of his life. It is assumed from his name that his roots lie in the municipality of Fuenllana, in the province of Ciudad Real, although he was born in Navalcarnero, Madrid. Blind from birth, he composed a Libro de música para vihuela intitulado Orphenica Lyra (Seville, 1554), dedicated to Philip II of Spain. At the arrival of Isabel de Valois, third wife of Philip II, she brought with her a group of French instrumental musicians who wished to stay in the Spanish court; Fuenllana alternated with this group and his musical works were performed together with those of foreign artists. At the death of the queen in 1568, he continued serving in the Spanish court. He later served Don Sebastian of Portugal in Lisbon starting in 1574.

== Works ==
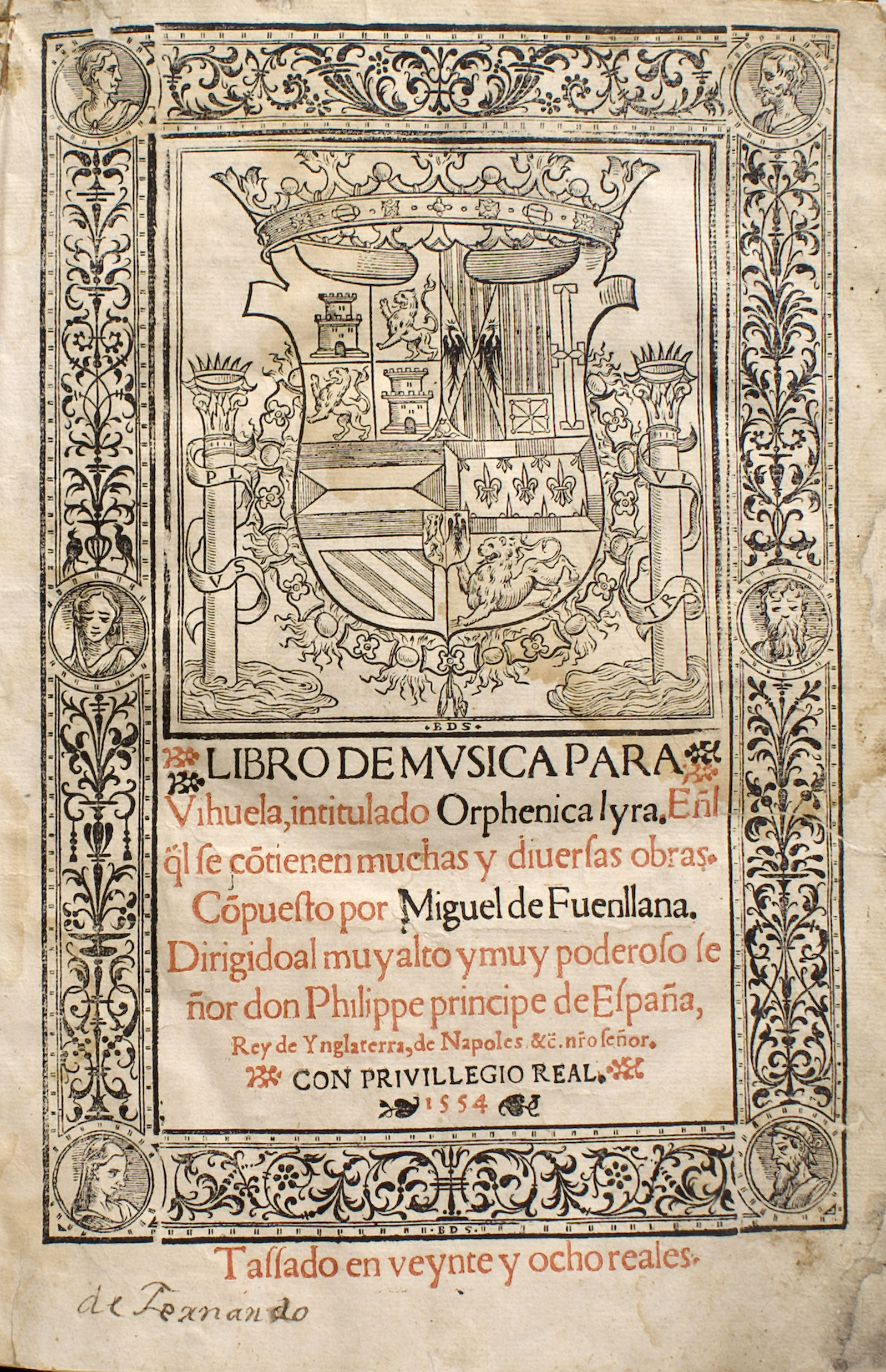
Cover of Miguel de Fuenllana's book for vihuela "Orphénica Lyra" published in 1554

Orphénica Lyra comprises 182 pieces in six volumes. In the first three, the pieces are ordered ascending by the number of voices, passing through 2 and 3 in the first to 5 and 6 in the motets of the third volume. The book includes 51 fantasias newly composed by Fuenllanas alongside works of 17 other composers. His style is polyphonic with a texture similar to that of Cristobal de Morales. This work also contains arrangements of vocal pieces by Josquin, Morales, Francisco Guerrero, and Philippe Verdelot, musicians from both Spain and the Low Countries. Fuenllana preferred the voice accompanied by vihuela to the vihuela solo. The vocal parts are written in red ciphers, indicating which notes are to be sung while the black ones are to be played on the vihuela; alternatively, one can play the whole intabulation although it is often very demanding (e.g., Mateo Flecha's Ensalada 'La Bomba' in the Libro Sexto).

The merits of Fuenllana's work were known to his contemporaries; in the Declaración de instrumentos of Fray Juan Bermudo, he writes:

Tengo por mejores tañedores a Narváez, a Martín de Jaén, a Hernando de Jaén, vecino de la ciudad de Granada, a López, músico del Señor Duque de Arcos, a Fuenllana, músico de la Señora Marquesa de Tarifa, a Mudarra, Canónigo de la Iglesia Mayor de Sevilla, y a Enrique, músico del Señor Conde de Miranda.

Fuenllana was adept at finding apt harmonies and counterpoint to popular melodies: some of these traditional pieces are De los alamos vengo, madre, used by Lope de Vega; Morenica, dame, Con que la lavare, De Antequera sale el moro, and the romance of the loss of Antequera; thus, he presaged the coming of the accompanied melody of the Italians at the beginning of the seventeenth century.
