= Music of Guatemala =

The music of Guatemala is diverse. Music is played all over the country. Towns also have wind and percussion bands that play during the lent and Easter-week processions as well as on other occasions. The marimba is an important instrument in Guatemalan traditional songs. The oldest documented use of marimba in the Americas dates to 1680 during celebrations at Santiago de los Caballeros de Guatemala.

Guatemala also has an almost five-century-old tradition of art music, spanning from the first liturgical chant and polyphony introduced in 1524 to contemporary art music. Much of the music composed in Guatemala from the 16th century to the 19th century has only recently been unearthed by scholars and is being revived by performers.

== Mayan music ==
Much of what is known about how the ancient Mayans created and played music comes from the iconography that is preserved in the ceremonial pieces of mural art, or codices. One example is found in the ancient Maya archaeological site of Bonampak, Mexico, where there are walls showing artwork of a group of Mayan warriors playing long trumpets, as portrayed in the Mayan theatrical play Rabinal Achí.

Many kinds of instruments were used, but they essentially broke down into two categories, being wind instruments (aerophones) and percussion instruments (idiophones). The wind instrument family consisted of cane and bone flutes, different types of whistles, ocarinas of various designs, and other sibilant vessels. For percussion instruments, the Mayans crafted wooden drums with membranes made from the hides of deer or jaguar. They also made rattles, güiros, and other idiophones using the shells of snails and tortoises. One of these percussion instruments called the “tunkul” (or sometimes just “tun”) is still seen in Guatemala today. It is made from a hollow tree trunk with an H-shaped incision whose resulting tongues are hit with rudimentary drumsticks.

The music the Mayans played was performed and danced to during festivities and rituals, usually in celebration of (or to communicate with) the gods that they worshiped. It appears that each god had their date or holiday, with its accompanying ceremonies and special music.

== Marimba ==
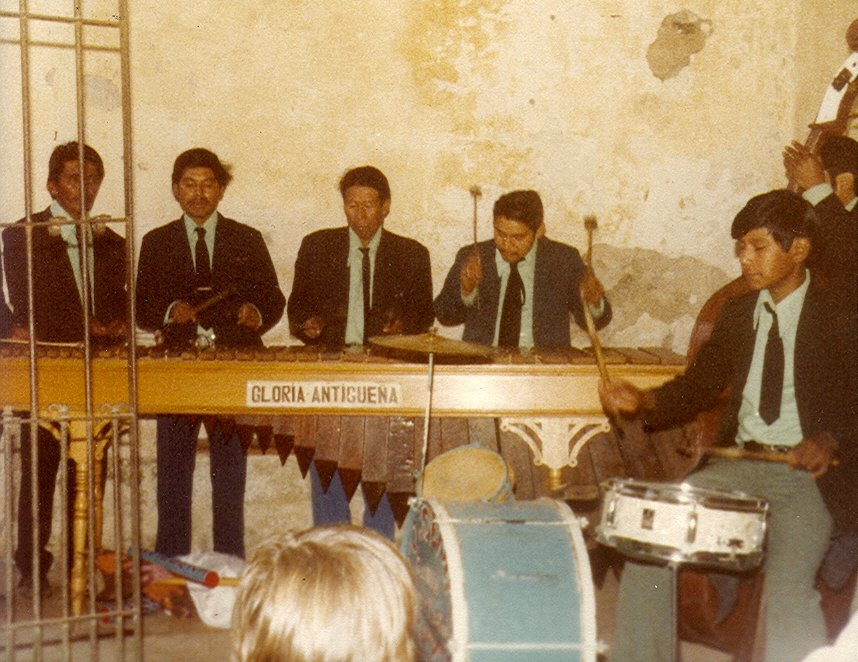
A Guatemalan marimba band.

The marimba's first documentary evidence of existence comes from an account in front of the cathedral of Santiago de Guatemala, present-day Antigua Guatemala, in 1680. Later, historian Juan Domingo Juarros mentioned and described it in his Compendium of the History of Guatemala. The instrument may be probably much older, as an attempt at recreating an older West African instrument, and could have been introduced by Afro-Caribbean slaves as early as 1550.

By the early 20th century, wooden box resonators had replaced the gourd resonators. Modern marimba bands include a smaller marimba for three players, a larger marimba for four players, plus a drum kit or other percussion and a string bass. Some bands have occasionally employed one or two saxophones, as well as one or two trumpets and a trombone.

Much of the older repertoire of salon music was learned and adopted by the marimba bands, while a sizable amount of new dance pieces was newly composed for the marimba by such composers and marimba players as Domingo Bethancourt (1906–82), the Ovalle brothers, the Hurtado brothers, as well as the famous Mariano Valverde (1884–1956), Wotzbelí Aguilar (1897–1940) and Belarmino Molina (1879–1950), to name but a few. Singer Paco Pérez (1917–1951) was catapulted to fame with his waltz "Luna de Xelajú", one of the best-known marimba pieces which is regarded by many Guatemalans as a sort of unofficial national anthem.

=== Types of marimbas ===
Marimba de Tecomates

This musical instrument is from Chichicastenango and it is made of palo de hormigo, a type of wood used for marimba manufacture, and pumpkins (tecomates). This type of marimba is played by a single person who is requested to liven up concerts of the brotherhood from Chichicastenango. Marimbas have many sizes and shapes and that is what makes this instrument so unique.

Marimba Simple

The soundboards of the marimba simple are made of wood such as cedar or cypress. It is tuned according to the key, and with a membrane glued with wax at the lower end, which allows the “charlco” (marimba stick) to facilitate the prolongation of the sound. The construction of the first marimba was diatonic, related to a key, and because it is easy to play it was called Marimba Simple. Sometimes the performers want a different sound so to get a “flattened” sound, the performers would stick a small ball of wax at one end of the keyboard, which flattens the sound down by a half tone. To marimba players this technique is called “transport”, and it is very common to see this technique applied to the marimba simple.

Arch or Ring Marimba

The arch marimba was probably the first, followed by a simple instrument with a diatonic row of wood bars played with mallets, with gourd resonators, placed on a wooden a stand. In 1894 came a major breakthrough when Julián Paniagua Martínez and Sebastián Hurtado developed the chromatic marimba by adding to the diatonic row of sound bars, comparable to the white keys of the piano, a second row equivalent to the black keys.

Marimba concert

The marimba concert is played by several musicians at a time. It was created when the Directorate General of Culture and Fine Arts belonged to the Ministry of Education. Master Lester Godinez was its first music director and Professor Ruben Alfonso Ramirez served as Director General of the administrative unit authorized for operation as of May 1, 1979. Its co-founders were Otoniel Godinez (assistant director), Alfonso Bautista Vasquez, Roberto Garcia, Gérman Amilcar Corzo, Manuel Toribio, Fidel Funes, Mario Bautista Vásquez and Erick Godoy Cámbara.

Chromatic Marimba

Chromatic Marimba is the standard marimba known worldwide. Developed in the southeast of Mexico and Guatemala inspired by the science of the marimba simple. It has the same functionality as the marimba simple but the difference is the chromaticism that this instrument has. This marimba is chromatic because you can have all 12 notes of the scale.

Marimba Cuache or Marimba Doble

This marimba was built with a double keyboard, one larger than the other representing the basic idea of the piano keys. It is very versatile to play and 3 or 4 performers can play it at the same time. This gives the performance more color and the whole spectrum of the high, mid and low register is used throughout the performance.

Lord Sebastian Hurtado, a native of Quetzaltenango, was the first person to build a marimba with a double keyboard, capable of producing chromatic scales around the beginning of the 20th century. Its construction was a suggestion of the musician Julian Paniagua Martinez. The first concert featuring a marimba doble in the City of Guatemala was in the year 1899, on the birthday of President Manuel Estrada Cabrera, where the Hurtado brothers gave a show for the president and all were very pleased with the result and versatility of the performance.

Marimba grande

The marimba grande is the larger of the two keyboards that make up the double marimba (marimba doble). It reflects the representative style in the construction of instruments from Guatemala. It is fully hand-made and the variety of wood they use gives this marimba a warm sound. Although over time, builders have added some metal support reinforcements to the structure of the marimba to make it more durable and stable. This instrument has a range of six octaves, from F-sharp to B-natural. The bars range in size from 5 inches x 3 / 4 to 15 x 3 inches. The instrument is 8.3 feet long and 9 inches wide at the lower end.

== Caribbean and Tropical music ==
During the mid‑20th century, Caribbean and tropical music genres spread widely across Central America, significantly influencing popular taste in countries like Guatemala. Radio broadcasts, television, migration, port‑city trade, and touring orchestras brought sounds from the Dominican Republic, Cuba, Puerto Rico, Trinidad, and Colombia into everyday life. Dance styles such as salsa (promoted by Fania Records), soca, cumbia (by Aniceto Molina), punta, and merengue (led by Wilfrido Vargas) quickly became part of Guatemala’s music scene, blending with local traditions and inspiring the formation of domestic bands.

Punta and the Garifuna Community

Punta, a lively music and dance style, comes from the Garifuna community along the Caribbean coast of Honduras, Belize, Guatemala, and Nicaragua. Known for its fast drum rhythms, and call-and-response singing. Punta has been an important way for the Garifuna people to preserve their culture and traditions. By 1978, Punta Rock emerged, blending traditional Punta with modern instruments like electric guitars and keyboards, bringing the music to a wider audience. The genre gained international attention with hits like “Sopa de Caracol”, by neighboring Belizean artist Hernan “Chico" Ramos , which introduced Punta rhythms to listeners around the world and inspired many Guatemalan musicians to incorporate them into popular music.

Merengue and Soca

By the late 1970's, Merengue, brought to Central America from the Dominican Republic, quickly became a major influence in Guatemala’s tropical music scene. Its lively, danceable rhythms blended naturally with Soca, a fast-paced genre originating in Trinidad and Tobago, producing a fusion that energized parties and festivals across the country. This combination inspired the formation of several Guatemalan bands, including Grupo Rana, La Gran Familia, FM de Zacapa, and Tormenta, who incorporated Soca’s syncopated beats into Merengue frameworks. Notably, Grupo Rana maintained direct ties with Dominican Merengue legend Wilfrido Vargas, creator of the iconic group Las Chicas del Can. Most of these bands released their music through DIDECA, S.A. (Discos de Centroamérica, S.A.), a Guatemalan record company credited primarily with manufacturing and distribution. DIDECA operated a widespread Central American network of affiliated companies, ensuring that tropical music reached audiences across the region. Additionally, the beloved Guatemalan waltz "Luna de Xelajú," composed by Paco Pérez in 1944, was later covered by Grupo Rana and transformed into a famous merengue hit, which would subsequently be recorded by Wilfrido Vargas on his 1987 album El Baile, as well as another Grupo Rana hit, "Socaribe," which he included on his 1989 album Animation.

Salsa

Salsa also played a central role in Guatemala’s musical landscape, guided by domestic bands such as Ensamble Latino. These groups drew inspiration from Colombian ensembles like Grupo Niche, neighboring Nicaraguan salsa artist Luis Enrique, and groups such as Adolescent's Orquesta, as well as international labels like Fania Records, which helped circulate salsa throughout Latin America. Puerto Rican salsa singer Willie González was also a major inspiration for the group’s romantic and melodic approach. Ensamble Latino solidified its presence through a steady run of releases under DIDECA, S.A, beginning with Salsa Y Sabor (1989), followed by La Maxima Expresion De La Salsa (1990), La Generacion De La Salsa (1991), and Con Salsa Si (1992). Guatemalan salsa bands adapted these diverse influences to local tastes, creating vibrant performances that blended traditional tropical rhythms with the syncopated, horn-driven energy of Caribbean salsa.

== European classical music tradition ==
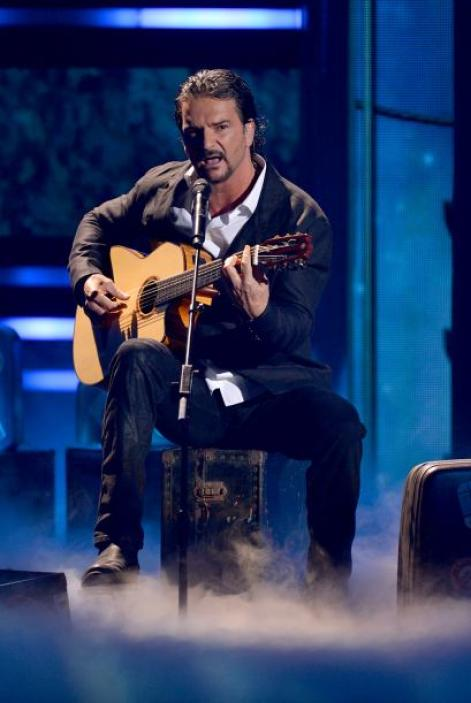
Ricardo Arjona

The field of music, otherwise known as "classical music", includes various musical styles such as Renaissance, baroque, classical, romantic, 20th-century music, and post-modern music. Guatemala was one of the first regions of the New World to be exposed to European music. The Spanish missionaries and clergy introduced Flemish and Spanish liturgical music during the early 16th century as part of the Roman Catholic rite.

The first cathedral (1534) at the newly founded city of Santiago de Guatemala was endowed with a choir in charge of plainchant and Latin polyphony. Later in the century three chapel masters from the Iberian peninsula enriched the cathedral's repertoire with their compositions: Hernando Franco (1532–85), Pedro Bermúdez (1558–1605), and Gaspar Fernández (1566–1629). Scholars have shown that musical activity in the missions of Huehuetenango, in the northwestern mountains of present-day Guatemala, was significant. Native musicians learned the art of polyphonic composition from the missionaries and also contributed a number of villancicos in Spanish and local Mayan languages to the repertory of matins and vespers music at their parish churches.

The main composers during the late baroque and pre-classical period were Guatemalan-born chapel masters of the cathedral, Manuel José de Quirós (d. 1765) and Rafael Antonio Castellanos (d. 1791). The latter successfully introduced Guatemalan folk-music elements in his vocal works, especially his villancicos for Christmas, which often show traits of Afro-Caribbean and Mayan rhythms, melodies, and accompaniment styles. His 176 extant works reflect Castellanos' mastery of the style of his time, as well as an unusual originality based on plainchant models, baroque part-writing, and the frequent inclusion folk-music idioms.

Several of Castellanos' disciples attained mastery of the villancico and the cantata, as is reflected by extant works by Pedro Antonio Rojas, Manuel Silvestre Pellegeros, Francisco Aragón, and Pedro Nolasco Estrada Aristondo. The successor of the latter as chapel master of the cathedral was Vicente Sáenz, who served in that capacity from 1804 to his death in 1841. The organist during his tenure was his son Benedicto Sáenz the elder, who prematurely died in 1831.

Among the composers of classical style the most important Guatemalan composer is José Eulalio Samayoa (1781-ca. 1866), the first musician in the New World to write symphonies besides a sizable amount of church music. His Seventh Symphony, dedicated to the victory of the Federal Army at Xiquilisco in present-day El Salvador, is a model of classical balance. His later Sinfonía Cívica and Sinfonía Histórica are kept in an early romantic idiom, with frequent programmatic episodes. José Escolástico Andrino, who worked in Guatemala City, Havana, and El Salvador during the first half of the 19th century, also composed several symphonies.

The brilliant young musician Benedicto Sáenz, the younger (d. 1857) on the other hand wrote much church music, such as his Messa Solenne published in Paris by advice of the Italian composer, Saverio Mercadante . At the same time, Sáenz and his brother Anselmo were the first to introduce Italian opera to Guatemala from 1843 on, an enterprise that after initial failures would turn into a huge success, leading to the construction of the magnificent National Theatre, later called Teatro Colón. An Italian opera company arrived in 1871 bringing Pietro Visoni as orchestra conductor and his wife Luisa Riva de Visoni as prima donna. Visoni was the former organist of the Duomo (cathedral) of Milan. After successful performances in the Teatro Colón and arriving at the time of a liberal revolution, maestro Visoni was asked by President Miguel Garcia Granados to take charge of the bands of the 1st and 2nd battalions of the Guatemalan army. Visoni merged the two bands and officially established the Martial Symphony Band (still in existence). Since there were not enough trained musicians in the country, Visoni created Guatemala's first music conservatory, the School of Substitutes (known today as Military School of Music Maestro Rafael Alvarez Ovalle). The School of Substitutes became the breeding ground for some of Guatemala's greatest composers, including Rafael Alvarez Ovalle, composer of the national anthem. In the 1940s members of the band were among the founding members of the National Symphony Orchestra.

The late 19th century is represented in Guatemala by several trends: the aforementioned introduction of opera, the training abroad of several highly talented pianist-composers, the influence of military band music, and the invention and development of the chromatic marimba.

Piano music was enormously furthered by scholarships for study in Italy and France awarded to several young talents. Thus, Luis Felipe Arias (1876–1908), Herculano Alvarado (1879–1921), Julián González, and Miguel Espinosa could present piano music by Ludwig van Beethoven, Frédéric Chopin, and Franz Liszt never heard before in Guatemala. They had also considerable influence on younger composers such as Rafael Vásquez, Alfredo Wyld and Rafael A. Castillo, all of whom flourished during the first decades of the twentieth century.

A group of composers furthered and instructed by the Prussian conductor and bandmaster, Emil Dressner, came from the realm of military bands and salon music. Germán Alcántara (1856–1911), Rafael Álvarez Ovalle (1855–1946), Manuel Moraga (1833–96), Julián Paniagua Martínez (1856–1946) and Fabián Rodríguez (1862–1929) contributed a number of salon pieces, opera fantasies, and dances to the repertoire of bands and pianists.

Another important achievement was the invention and development of the chromatic marimba in the highland town of Quetzaltenango in 1894, by Julián Paniagua Martínez and the marimba builder, Sebastián Hurtado. This new development made it possible to play the fashionable dance and salon music on the marimbas, which previously had been restricted to the diatonic scale. As a result, Guatemalan light music achieved an enormous dissemination at home and abroad by countless marimba bands that were formed from the beginning of the twentieth century. Much of the music of that time is still alive in the memorized repertoire of present-day marimba groups.

By the end of the nineteenth and in the first part of the 20th century, several composers developed a keen interest in Mayan mythology and folk music, on which they based their scenic and concert compositions. Jesús Castillo (1877–1946) was the first musician to collect a sizable amount of folk tunes, which he later used in works such as his opera Quiché Vinak, as well as ouvertures and symphonic poems. His half brother Ricardo Castillo (1891–1966) studied in Paris, where he acquired impressionistic and neo-classical techniques. His piano music, as well as his orchestral output, reflects the fusion of his contemporary art with Mayan mythology such as legends and myths from the Popol Vuh. José Castañeda (1898–1983) also took keen interest in the Mayan past in his stage works such as the ballet La serpiente emplumada (The Feathered Snake), premiered in 1958, while his two symphonies his string quartets are much more experimental.

Composers from the next generation, some of them Ricardo Castillo's and José Castañeda's students who could also profit from the teachings of the Austrian composer, Franz Ippisch, continued to focus on the autochthonous Guatemalan cultures. In their stage, vocal, and instrumental works, they have shown an interest in Mayan and Garifuna cultural elements, which they have stylized in different ways. Among these, Joaquín Orellana (b. 1930) has developed idiophones and aerophones derived from the marimba and other folk instruments, which he uses in some of his aleatory compositions that deal with the social strife of present-day ethnic groups.

Among his former students, the Gandarias brothers have focused on electronic process of folk-music and bird calls recorded on site, producing several discs. At the beginning of the new millennium, two multimedia works by contemporary composer Dieter Lehnhoff, Memorias de un día remoto (Memories of a Distant Day) and Rituales nocturnos (Night Rituals) have evoked the Mayan past in a more contemporary style, being conceived as the soundtrack to an imaginary film. The sojourn of the Garifuna to Central American shores on the other hand is the subject of Satuyé, his opera in progress. Among the younger composers, several have written works in a variety of post-modern styles, often returning to traditional or free tonality in their vocal and instrumental compositions.

In 1930 comes to air radio TGW, the Voice Guatemala, first station of long wave. Later, in 1946, begins the time of the national broadcasting. In that period, the transmitters produced dramatized pieces, arose programs from quality that could compete with the foreigners; the broadcasting reached their maximum development. The station has had an entertainment focus, featuring artist such as: Paco Pérez, Gustavo Adolfo Palma, Juan de Dios Quezada, Manolo Rosales, Jorge Mario Paredes and Ernesto Rosales.

=== Music life ===
Present-day Guatemala boasts a number of performing organizations, such as orchestras, choirs, chamber ensembles, opera troupes, soloists and dozens of rock bands.

The Orquesta Sinfónica Nacional was founded in after the 1944 Revolution, transforming from an earlier government orchestra called Orquesta Progresista. For several years it was directed by the notable violinist, Andrés Archila. In 1964 a permanent conductor was appointed Ricardo del Carmen, who was joined in the early 1970s by Jorge Sarmientos, another music director. In 1991, after both conductors retired, the orchestra decided to dispense with a permanent music director, working only with guest artists. As a result, many of the orchestra's concerts are conducted by some of its members, who are not necessarily trained in orchestral conducting. This orchestra is endowed with subsidy from the government to cover salaries and expenses. It has yearly seasons, one of which includes international guests; the other seasons are popular and didactic in nature.

The Orquesta Sinfónica Juvenil was founded in 1970 by Manuel Alvarado Coronado. It was a youth orchestra, and its members were students at different schools in Guatemala City. Without financial support, it was forced to develop its activities with the aid of parents.

The Orquesta Millennium is an independent organization founded in 1993 by Dieter Lehnhoff and Cristina Altamira. Initially called Nueva Orquesta Filarmónica, it played its first concert seasons in the Auditorium of the Universidad del Valle de Guatemala, as well as other locations. It made its first CD La Sociedad Filarmónica in 1993, with premiere recordings of works by Guatemalan classical composers José Eulalio Samayoa, José Escolástico Andrino, and Benedicto Sáenz, the younger. In 1998 it was appointed official orchestra of the City of Guatemala, under the protection of the Mayor and City Council, with the name of Orquesta Metropolitana. In 2004 it separated from the City government, became independent again, and changed its name to Millennium Orchestra. The Orchestra has recorded the highly successful CDs Valses inolvidables de Guatemala and Melodías inolvidables de Guatemala, both of them with music by Guatemalan composers.

The Orquesta Clásica was founded in the early 1990s. It is a private orchestra, which plays at the Universidad Francisco Marroquín for their classical season. Since the death of its original leader in 2003, it has been conducted by guests. In September 2007 the university cancelled all of the remaining season concerts and withdrew its support.

The Orquesta Sinfónica Jesús Castillo, a youth orchestra, was established in 1997, after a series of workshops conducted by a group of Venezuelan instrumental teachers. Its members are students of the National Conservatory and other privates academies. Its first musical director was Igor Sarmientos 1997–2007. This orchestra had the partial support of the government to cover their expenses until 2007.

Among the choirs active in Guatemala, the oldest organization is the Coro Nacional, founded after the 1944 Revolution as Coro Guatemala. Over the decades, it has introduced many works by European composers, as well as numerous Guatemalan songs and choral compositions. It is the only choral group with government support, and offers several yearly concert sessions.

The university choirs are also very important, and gather in yearly traditional choral festivals. There are also independent, and amateur choral organizations. At the beginning of the new millennium, several choirs of children and young have sprouted, not only in Guatemala City, but also in towns and rural areas.

There are several chamber ensembles such as wind quintets, string quartets, brass choirs, and groups specializing in baroque performance practices. Among these, the Millennium Ensemble has raised much attention by their first performances of Renaissance, baroque, and classical works from colonial Guatemala, which they have presented at festivals and concerts in Europe, North- and South America. Since their first CD, released in 1992, up to their twelfth CD Joyas del Barroco in Guatemala (2006), they have revived numerous works of 18th-century composers as Manuel José de Quirós, Rafael Antonio Castellanos, and Pedro Nolasco Estrada Aristondo, with mezzo-soprano Cristina Altamira performing villancicos and cantatas for different occasions of the Catholic liturgical year.

Opera has also regained favour, with yearly performances at local festivals in Guatemala City and Antigua Guatemala. Guatemalan Baritone Luis Girón May (b. 1953, d. August 2013) has been influential in obtaining significant sponsorships for the staging of several operas by Verdi and Puccini. Foreign opera companies also visit the country on occasion, performing in the magnificent National Theatre in Guatemala City or on historical locations in Antigua Guatemala.

There are also well known film scoring composers from Guatemala such as Pieter Schlosser and Mauricio Trabanino.

== Modern popular music ==
In recent decades, Guatemala has produced a variety of popular performers, such as pop vocalists, Guatemalan rock bands, bachata, salsa and merengue bands, hip hop and reggaeton, disk-jockeys, trios, and mariachi bands. The best known popsinger/songwriter from Guatemala is Ricardo Arjona.

One of the better-known pop-rock bands during the 1980s and 90s was the group Alux Nahual. While this group has been separated since 1998, their recordings are still favoured by a certain age group of Guatemalan city-dwellers. In the teen pop genre, artists like Vanessa Spatz were exported internationally, with the support of Siempre En Domingo and toured broadly around Latin America. Her music being distributed worldwide by PolyGram. She retired as a performer in 1991 and continued her career as a producer and songwriter, co-producing the song "Email Me" for Jose Jose with Luny Tunes for the record label Bertelsmann Music Group known as BMG. Notable vocalists from the 20th century include Luis Galich, Roberto Rey, Herman May, Tania Zea, Karim May, and Elizabeth.

== Alternative music ==
Bands such as Bohemia Suburbana, Viernes verde, La Tona and E.x.t.i.n.c.i.o.n. were the cornerstone for the alternative rock movement of the 90s, during the time of the post-war in Guatemala. These bands still enjoy a level of success, mostly because during that time FM Radio (stations such as Doble S then renamed Atmosfera, FM Fenix, Metroestereo, La Marca) represented a huge push for rock bands.

There were also underground movements during the 90s that went the opposite direction; with bands such as Pusher (metal), Fuerza X (hardcore), Domestic Fool (punk) among others setting new styles outside the mainstream movements. Recently there has been a documentary called "Alternativa" which documents the alternative and Garra Chapina movement from the 90s to this day.

Today, the musical scene in Guatemala is populated by diverse bands and vocalists. Online radio El Circo del Rock promotes the diverse talent nationally and abroad, but it is still directed to a 90s audience.

== Underground music ==
During the year 2006, the last Rock station on FM disappeared from the airwaves and there was no longer support from the media. As a result, several hundreds of musicians started developing musical styles on underground movements and selfproducing, and also because of the lack of support from the media, the bands started promoting on the internet on sites such as Myspace.com and Rockrepublik.net and targeted on smaller audiences in more specific music genres, this also had as a consequence an overpopulation of musical projects which are still (nowadays) looking for a way to bring a new face to music in Guatemala.

In 2010 there are several projects which have been transcending among the overpopulated underground movement: Dubvolution in reggae dub. Evilminded in electronic Music. Treateth, Virus Belico, Metal Requiem and Zarkasmo in Metal. Los Mojarras and Xb'alanke in instrumental music. and several other artists such as None at Last, Assabeth, Silent Poetry, Trinky, Madam Funtoo and pop sensation Woodser.

Perhaps the best known bands are Bohemia Suburbana, La Tona, Viernes Verde, Viento en Contra, Malacates Trebol Shop and El Tambor de la Tribu, although there are many others. Notable popular singers include a new generation of pop stars such as Tuco Cardenas (whose music genre is actually folk), Magda Angélica, Shery, Carlos Catania, Tavo Barcenas, Giovanni Passarelli, Raul Aguirre and Carlos Peña, just to name a few.

In Metal music there are bands like Treateth, Virus Belico, Celula, Zarcasmo, Metal Requiem, E.X.T.I.N.C.I.O.N., TOBA, Astaroth, A Walking Legend and to many others.

Guatemala also has a growing rap scene with artists like Última Dosis, Kontra, Rebeca Lane, N.D.R., Expresión Illegal, Ikari, Bacteria Sound System Crew, Aliotos Lokos, among others.
