= Guatemala City Choirbooks =

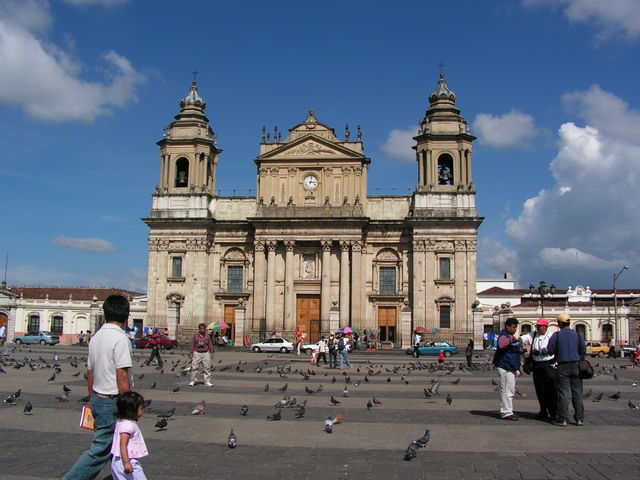
The cathedral of Guatemala City

The Guatemala City Choirbooks form a collection of the Roman Catholic liturgical music used in the Cathedral of Guatemala City in the 16th and early 17th centuries. During that time, the cathedral (eventually demolished in 1669 after deterioration caused by several earthquakes) was an important center of Spanish culture in the Americas, with polyphonic music already in use in the 1540s. The choirbooks were copied and bound in 1602 by Gaspar Fernandes who was the cathedral's choirmaster and organist from 1599 until 1606. Several of the books are still in existence and held in the archives of the current Guatemala City cathedral.

One of the choirbooks, previously thought to be lost, was discovered in the Guatemala City cathedral following an earthquake in 1976. In 1996, it was published by University of Chicago Press in a complete modern edition with an accompanying study by the musicologist, Robert J. Snow (1926-1998), under the title A New-World collection of polyphony for Holy Week; Guatemala City Cathedral Archive, Music Ms. 4. Dedicated to Robert Stevenson, the book contains music for Holy Week and Lenten Salve services and includes four settings of the Passion and two unique settings of the Lamentations of Jeremiah the Prophet. Amongst the composers represented are Francisco Guerrero, Cristóbal de Morales, Hernando Franco and Pedro Bermúdez. In order to encourage the use and spread of this music the University of Chicago Press rescinded their copyright for performance purposes.

== See also ==
- Guatemalan art music
