= Dieter Lehnhoff =

Guatemalan composer

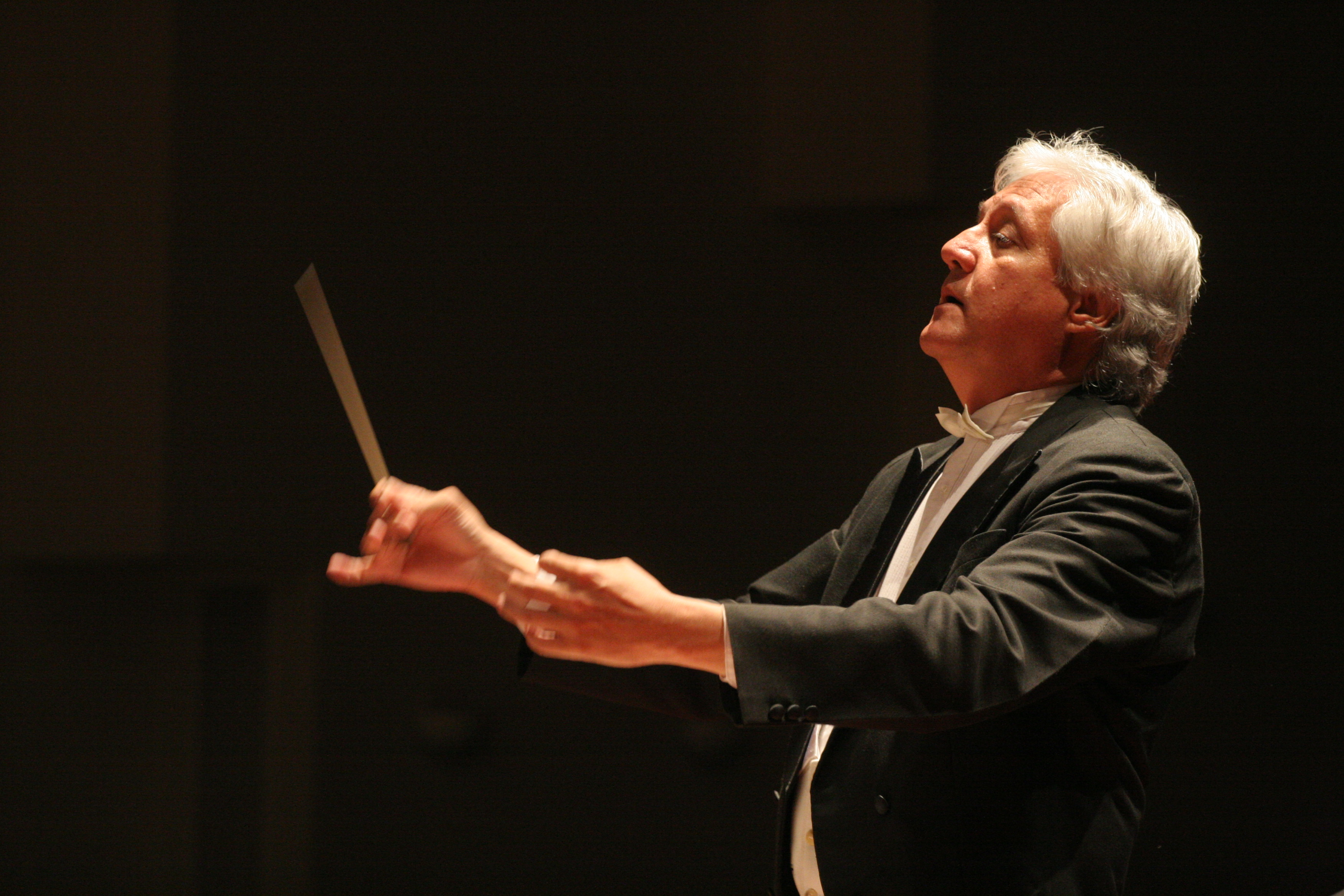
Dieter Lehnhoff conducting

Dieter Lehnhoff Temme (born 27 May 1955) is a German-Guatemalan composer, conductor and musicologist.

== Life ==
Dieter Lehnhoff Temme was born in Guatemala City to German settlers in 1955. He has been a pupil of Klaus Ager, Gerhard Wimberger, Josef Maria Horváth, and Dr. Friedrich C. Heller in Salzburg. His musique concréte work Requiem was premiered in 1975 at the Austrian Broadcasting (ORF). He earned his master's (M.A.) and doctoral (Ph.D.) degrees with distinction at the Benjamin T. Rome School of Music of The Catholic University of America in Washington, D.C., where he was a graduate student of Conrad Bernier and Helmut Braunlich (composition), Donald Thulean (conducting), Cyrilla Barr, Ruth Steiner, and Robert M. Stevenson (musicology). [1]

=== Recent works ===
His original compositions have been performed in Europe as well as North and South America. His Misa de San Isidro (2001) for a cappella chorus was premiered in Tenerife, the Canary Islands, Spain, in 2002, and has been performed by different professional choirs at festivals in Medellín, Tokyo, and New York City. His Piano Concerto No. 1 (2005), dedicated to the Russian pianist and teacher, Alexandr Sklioutovski, was premiered in June, 2006 at the National Theatre in Guatemala City by José Pablo Quesada as a soloist and the Millennium Orchestra, the composer conducting. In 2007, it was performed to critical acclaim at the National Theatre in San José, Costa Rica, again with pianist Quesada and the composer conducting the National University Symphony Orchestra. Quesada also performed it at the 15th Latin American Music Festival in Caracas, Venezuela in May, 2008, with the National Philharmonic Orchestra of Venezuela. Lehnhoff's Piano Concerto No. 2 (2007) premiered in August, 2008 in Guatemala City by concert pianist Sergio Sandí, with the combined Millennium Orchestra and Bachensemble Leipzig, the composer conducting. The concertos are written in a personal, highly original post-modern style in which contemporary art-music idioms and techniques, but also blues, tango, and jazz influences can be traced. His aphoristical twelve-tone Hai-kai for piano has attracted the attention of scholars such as the distinguished musicologist Dr. Tamara Sklioutovskaia, and has been performed by international pianists. His piano and chamber music have been performed at numerous festivals in Europe, North- and South America. His diptych, called Escenas primigenias, was published on CD and served as cinematic development. His stage work in progress Satuyé, on his own multilingual libretto, is about the Afro-Caribbean Garinagu (or Garifuna) people and their arrival at Central American shores.

=== Revival of historical music ===
His research of the music of Guatemala has revealed a previously unknown musical wealth, including the Maya, Renaissance, baroque, classical, romantic, 20th century, and current trends. From the early 1980s on, Dieter Lehnhoff had become interested in searching for music composed in Central America and specifically Guatemala during the Spanish rule (1524–1821). His research initiatives brought to light a number of compositions by Renaissance masters Hernando Franco, Pedro Bermúdez, and Gaspar Fernández, as well as Guatemalan baroque composers Manuel José de Quirós, Rafael Antonio Castellanos, Pedro Antonio Rojas, and José Eulalio Samayoa. A first anthology was published in Antigua Guatemala in 1984. The music was revived in a number of concerts conducted by Lehnhoff, thus surprising the musical world with a new repertoire of high quality. The first series of digital recordings (1992–99), which spanned from the late Maya times to the end of the 20th century, was released as part of the monumental Historia General de Guatemala, an encyclopedic publication in six volumes written by over 150 specialists in every historical area. The series of seven CDs included premiere recordings of music from every historical period. The revival of the historic Music of Guatemala through Lehnhoff's concerts, writings, and recordings had a significant effect on the strengthening of the cultural identity of Guatemalans in times of civil confrontation and turmoil. The dissemination of his musical and historical findings at more than 40 international festivals, concerts, congresses, and meetings also helped restore the country's cultural image and prestige.

As a conductor, he has founded and directed various instrumental groups, orchestras, and choral groups. He has been invited to perform as a conductor, composer, lecturer, or leader of his Millennium Ensemble at over forty international festivals and concerts in Argentina, Austria, Brazil, Chile, Colombia, Costa Rica, Cuba, El Salvador, Germany, Guatemala, Japan, Mexico, Nicaragua, Paraguay, Spain, the United States, and Venezuela. He has produced a series of compact discs with premiere recordings of works by Guatemalan composers of all times.

=== Academic programmes ===
In the academic field, he also pioneered by establishing and directing several institutions and programs devoted to the strengthening of musical culture in Guatemala. Thus, he proposed and carried out the design and establishment of the Music Department at the Universidad del Valle de Guatemala, which offered, for the first time in the country, a Bachelor's degree and a teaching license in Music. He also established the Institute of Musicology at the Universidad Rafael Landívar , which is under his direction and is primarily devoted to musicological research. He has taught numerous courses in musicology, music theory, applied music, and composition. He has also been an invited professor at the doctoral program of the National University of Costa Rica. For his extensive writings, he was made a corresponding member of the Royal Spanish Academy, being also invited to join the Academies of History of Argentina, Guatemala, Puerto Rico, Spain, Uruguay, and Venezuela.

He is the founder and president of the Guatemalan Music Council, affiliated with the International Music Council.

== Selected compositions ==
Orchestral:

- Symphony No. 1 (Sinfonía poética) (1975)
- Symphony No. 2 (Sinfonía festiva) (1990)
- Concerto for Piano and Orchestra No. 1 (2005)
- Concerto for Piano and Orchestra No. 2 (2007)
- Concerto for Piano and Orchestra No. 3 (2020)
- Tardes de feria (2008)
- Caribe Suite No. 1 (2009)

Stage:

- Streichquartett, music theatre (1974)
- Milarepa Superstar, musical (1977, score lost)
- Caribe, opera (2007–11)
- Pimalina, opera (2022)

Vocal-choral:

- Cinco canciones criollas, own lyrics (1976)
- Cantos latinos de natividad, Latin texts (1988)
- Misa de San Isidro, Latin text of the Mass ordinary (2001)
- Chaaj: el juego de pelota Maya, own poem (2003)
- Salve, cara Parens, mezzo-soprano or baritone, strings, and piano, Latin poem by Rafael Landívar (2011)
- Seht das Schiff heimwärts ziehen, soprano, guitar, flute, vibraphone, percussion; German Lyrics by Anna Baar (2022)

Chamber:

- Canto IV, clarinet quartet (1985)
- In memoriam, violin, clarinet, and cello (1989)
- Santelmo, solo violin (1990)
- Cantares del Llano, string or wind quintet (1994)
- Incidente en Izabal, clarinet and marimba (1997); also clarinet, cello, and piano (2022)
- Kyrieleis, string quartet (2002)
- Llegó Pacheco, wind quintet (2004)
- Tardes de feria, wind quintet (2005)
- Sonata urbana, clarinet and piano, also a version for viola or cello and piano (2010)
- Música lúdica, flute, clarinet, and piano (2012)
- Sonata porteña, flute and piano (2013)
- Caribe Suite No. 2, clarinet and string quartet (2013)
- Concerto a 6, marimba and wind quintet (2020)

Piano:

- Album para la juventud (1988)
- Hai-kai (2001)
- Doppler (2012)

Electro-acoustic:

- Requiem (1975)
- Memorias de un día remoto (1999)
- Rituales nocturnos (1999)

== Books ==
- Creación musical en Guatemala. Guatemala City: Editorial Galería Guatemalea, 2005.
- Huellas de la guerra en el arte musical Guatemala City: International Red Cross Committee, 1999.
- Música y músicos de Guatemala. Guatemala City: Universidad Rafael Landívar, Cultura de Guatemala, 1995.
- Rafael Antonio Castellanos: vida y obra de un músico guatemalteco. Guatemala City: Universidad Rafael Landívar, Instituto de Musicología, 1994.
- Espada y pentagrama: la música polifónica en la Guatemala del siglo XVI. Guatemala City: Universidad Rafael Landívar, 1984.
