= Music in Colonial Mexico =

Music during the Spanish colonial period in Mexico (1521–1821)

Music in Colonial Mexico (also known as Music of New Spain) refers to the European classical music cultivated in the Viceroyalty of New Spain from the Spanish conquest in 1521 until Mexican independence in 1821.

Spanish missionaries and settlers introduced Renaissance, Baroque and later Classical styles, which were performed in cathedrals, missions and convents. Indigenous musicians quickly learned European polyphony, and uniquely Mexican hybrid works emerged, including villancicos sung in Nahuatl and other native languages. Most surviving music is sacred, but important collections of secular guitar music also remain.

== History ==
European music arrived with the Spanish in the early 16th century. Missionaries used music as a tool for evangelization, teaching Indigenous people to sing plainchant and polyphony. By the late 16th century, major cathedrals (Mexico City, Puebla, Oaxaca, Morelia and Guatemala City) had professional choirs, orchestras and chapel masters (maestros de capilla).

Musical life followed European trends but developed its own character through the blending of Spanish, Indigenous and (later) African influences.

== Sacred music ==
The vast majority of preserved colonial music is sacred vocal works for choir and orchestra, including masses, motets, psalms and villancicos. These were performed during religious feasts, especially Christmas and the Feast of the Virgin of Guadalupe.

Notable surviving collections come from the cathedrals of Mexico City and Puebla.

== Secular music ==
Secular music includes guitar tablatures and dance pieces. The most important source is the Códice Saldívar No. 4 (c. 1730), a manuscript of Baroque guitar music by Santiago de Murcia containing fandangos, tarantelas and other dances. Another collection is the Eleanor Hague Manuscript, now in Los Angeles.

== Notable composers ==
=== Renaissance period ===
- Hernando Franco (1532–1585) — one of the earliest and most important composers in the Americas; maestro de capilla in Guatemala and Mexico City.
- Gaspar Fernández (c. 1570–1629) — known for villancicos in Nahuatl and other Indigenous languages.
- Juan Gutiérrez de Padilla (c. 1590–1664) — prominent in Puebla Cathedral.

=== Baroque period ===
- Antonio de Salazar (c. 1650–1715) — long-serving maestro de capilla at Mexico City Cathedral.
- Manuel de Sumaya (c. 1678–1755) — the first native-born Mexican to become maestro de capilla; composed the first opera in the Americas (La Partenope, 1711).
- Ignacio de Jerusalem (1707–1769) — Italian-born but worked in Mexico; introduced the lighter galant style and composed many masses and villancicos performed as far as California.

=== Classical period (late colonial) ===
- Manuel Arenzana
- José Antonio del Corral
