= Cristina Altamira =

Argentine female singer

Cristina Altamira (born 2 February 1953 Buenos Aires, Argentina) is a mezzo-soprano specializing in baroque and Latin American music.

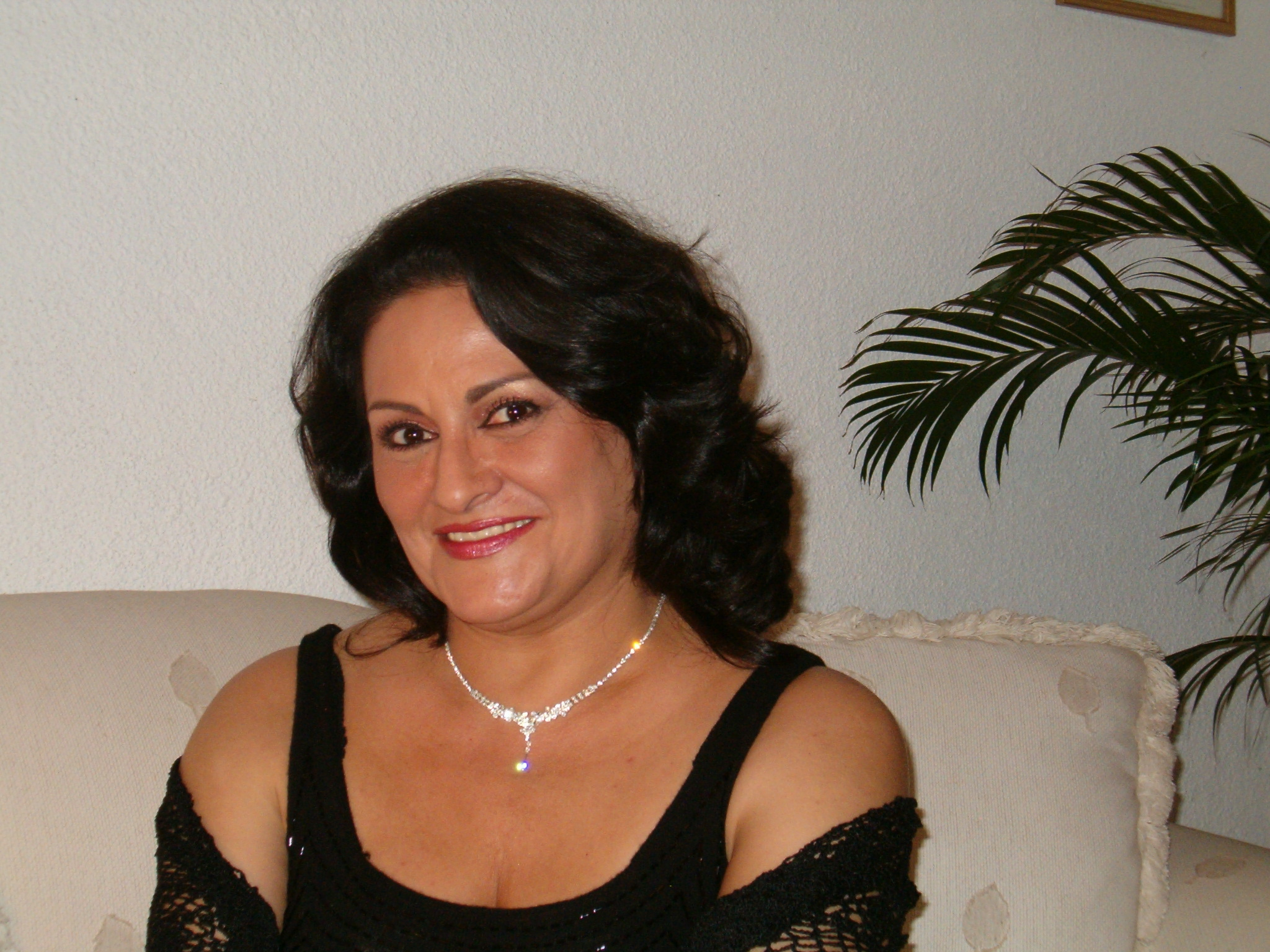
Cristina Altamira

== Biography ==
Born into an Argentine family of Spanish descent, Altamira trained in Buenos Aires with her father, Manuel Altamira, a well-known tenor specializing in the genres of tango and milonga. She also became conversant with Argentine folk dance and guitar playing, and was a member of various choral organizations and music groups. After a performance tour through Argentina, Peru, Ecuador, Colombia, and Venezuela, she settled in Caracas. Here she founded the vocal-instrumental ensemble Alabanza, taking much interest in the study of Venezuelan folk music, instruments, and vocal techniques. In 1977 she recorded the album Gracias together with Pedro Inatty and Dieter Lehnhoff, whom she had met in Caracas and who became her husband.

After settling in Guatemala, Altamira developed an interest in Renaissance music from Europe and especially Spain, the country of her ancestors. She studied with Marina Prado Bolaños and Manuel Gómez, and performed as soloist with the accompaniment of lutenist Alejandro Herrera and with the Da Camera Ensemble. After a new period in Venezuela for a series of performances, she returned to Guatemala, where she sang and acted in theatrical productions such as Sophocles' Antigona, Calderón de la Barca's La vida es sueño (Life is a Dream), and the musical Un sueño hecho realidad (A Dream Come True) with the Carrusel group, winning the Opus 1983 award for the best theatre music. At the same time she began to devote herself to the project of reviving Guatemalan music from the Renaissance and baroque with the ensemble, now renamed Capella Antiqua. They were awarded the "15th of September" Central American Music Prize in 1985.

For four years she resided in Washington, D.C., with her husband and their two children, Gabriela and Sebastian. Here she sang Spanish American baroque music with The New World Consort and studied voice with Raymond McGuire. Upon return to Guatemala, she founded the Millennium Ensemble together with Dieter Lehnhoff. With this new group she recorded premieres of a sizable number of villancicos, songs, and cantatas by Manuel José de Quirós, Rafael Antonio Castellanos, Pedro Nolasco Estrada Aristondo, José Eulalio Samayoa, and José Escolástico Andrino. Further recordings included Masses, hymns, and vespers music by Hernando Franco, Pedro Bermúdez, and Gaspar Fernández, as well as orchestral songs by Luis Felipe Arias, Rafael Alvarez Ovalle, and Rafael Juárez Castellanos. At the same time, she has cultivated European baroque and classical repertoire, performing cantatas by Johann Sebastian Bach, arias by Wolfgang Amadeus Mozart, and odes by Henry Purcell.

Altamira has sung solo parts in numerous concerts in various countries with the Millennium Ensemble, as well as with the New Philharmonic Orchestra, later Metropolitan Orchestra and finally Millennium Orchestra. She has participated in festivals and concerts in Argentina, Colombia, Ecuador, El Salvador, Guatemala, Nicaragua, Paraguay, Peru, Spain, Venezuela, and the United States to great acclaim.. For her outstanding performances, she was awarded a number of prizes such as the Dante Alighieri Medal. She is also a founding member of the Guatemalan Music Council, affiliated to the International Music Council of Unesco.

In 2001 Altamira commenced her radio broadcasting programme "Barroco de dos mundos" (Baroque from Two Worlds) on the Guatemalan national public Radio Faro Cultural 104.5 FM. The programme, which airs every Friday night at 8 PM for a full hour, is devoted to the dissemination of new discoveries of baroque music from the Americas and Europe, having found a wide audience and critical acclaim.

== Recordings ==
- Lila, LP, 1975
- Gracias, LP, 1977
- Capilla Musical, CD, 1992
- La Sociedad Filarmónica, CD, 1993
- Coros de Catedral, CD, 1995
- Ecos de antaño, CD, 1997
- Los caminos de Santiago, CD, 1999
- Tesoros musicales de la Antigua Guatemala, CD, 2003
- Joyas del Barroco en Guatemala, CD, 2006
