= Guatemalan rock =

Guatemalan Rock or Rock Chapín is a genre of rock music which has been developing in Guatemala since the mid-1970s.

== Guatemalan Rock Music ==
Spanish language rock music originated in mid-1960s Guatemala. One of the biggest acts of this early period was Luis Galich and his band Santa Fé. Santa Fé played gigs and concerts in Guatemala City and across greater Guatemala. Bands such as Plástico Pesado (later renamed Quetzalumán), which was composed of Manu Ramirez, Tacuche, Rollin y Paco Lam, expanded Guatemalan rock, experimenting with psychedelic influences and original material. Other psychedelic bands of the time included: S.O.S. (Rony de Leon, Chepito Hope, David de Gandarias, Armando Fong), Caballo Loco, Apple Pie (Tito Henkle, Luis Zetina, Rico Molina & Gentry), Cuerpo y Alma, Banda Clásica, Cerebro, La Compañía, Siglo XX, Eclipse, and Pastel de Fresa.

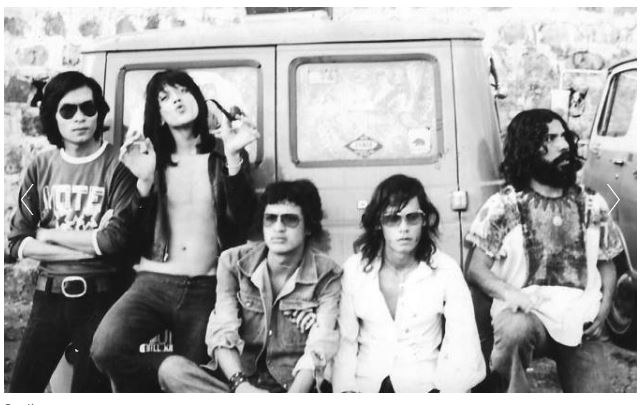
PLASTICO PESADO in its original format (1975)

One remarkable milestone was the unprecedented creation in 1973–74 of the rock opera Corazón del sol naciente (Heart of the Sunrise) by Sol Naciente, a large youth group of dancers, vocalists, an extended chorus, as well as a band which included Guatemalan percussion instruments and unplugged acoustic guitars, piano, and solo violin. Some of the band members later formed the group Alción.

A very important and popular band during the late 1990s and early 2000s was Alux Nahual. They are one of the Spanish lyric writing/singing rock bands that have released a number of recordings in Guatemala. In the beginning, they were heavily influenced by progressive rock' bands such as Kansas (band) and Jethro Tull (band). Though they added a very important native theme to their lyrics, it never really evolved into their sound. Their members are active musicians playing reunion concerts but mostly keep working as individuals producing and performing.

Another popular band was Extincion, which opened for bands such as Control Machete and Enrique Bunbury. They were characterized by their hard lyrics and speed metal sounds.

Guatemalan rock bands such as Radio Viejo, Ricardo Andrade y los Últimos Adictos (which disbanded after their leader, Ricardo Andrade, was murdered in Sanarate, El Progreso), Bohemia Suburbana, Viernes verde and Viento en Contra enjoyed popularity among high-school and college students during the 1990s and 2000s. Also popular were Fabulas and La Tona, and Bohemia Suburbana, the most influential band to emerge from the scene around that decade. Fusing influences like U2 and Soda Stereo, Bohemia Suburbana created something rooted in well-crafted melodies and arrangements. Their most noted influences came from underground American and European sounds and some from South America and the Caribbean. The band has been active again after their reunion in 2012 called BS20; they released a new album entitled Imaginaria Sonora which put them back in the Guatemalan rock scene. Their recent single/video Pero Nadie received 20,000 views in one day.

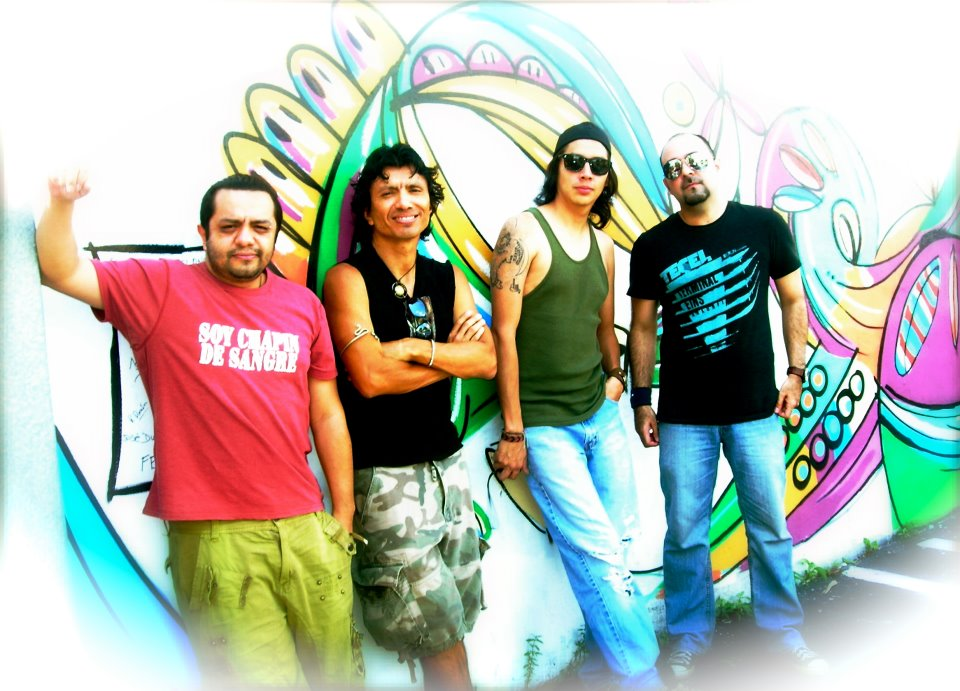
Viernes Verde in Miami whilst recording their sixth album, April 2012.

Additionally, Viernes Verde, who formed in 1993 (around the same time as Bohemia Suburbana) has continued to perform despite numerous lineup changes. Viernes Verde are also the founders of the rock festival La Garra Chapina, which was created by them to help newcomers get into the Guatemalan rock industry. According to their official band web page, the idea of this concert was to transmit their message through audiovisual aids to represent historical Guatemalan moments. This concert event was one of the first to be broadcast in its entirety by national radio stations in Guatemala. It had a full house and has been continued annually since 1999. Viernes Verde started as a grunge band, but has evolved to play different music styles which gives the band one of its distinctive characteristics. The sounds of Viernes Verde, based on the majority of their songs, would be described as alternative rock. One of the main factors that allowed the group to gain such a strong popularity is their ability to appeal to a broad audience. On their first album titled, Cenizas Bajo Tus Pies, they have six tracks in Spanish and four in English. Having songs in both languages allows them the opportunity to connect with a larger audience.

Some Guatemalan rock bands active in the present are: Razones de Cambio, El Tambor de la Tribu, Malacates Trebol Shop, Viernes verde, Redhka, La Gran Calabaza, El Clubo, Viento en Contra, Anarkia, Sinattra, Legión, Vitriolo, Bohemia Suburbana, and Especies, among many others. Newer bands, like 4 Tiempos, have emerged in the early 2000s. Hedras Ramos is a young rock guitar player, perhaps the most prolific guitarist representing Guatemala in countries like England and Romania at rock world guitar competitions like Guitar Idol and Ziua Chitarelor 3 respectively.

Guatemalan Rock and Roll came to be an influence in the broader Guatemalan society and was synonymous with rebellion, yet it never provided a medium in which a broad base of youth from the 60s and 70s could make something influential enough to affect change in all sectors of society. There were some major factors that prohibited it from being popularly accepted among the country of Guatemalans. During this period, there was a lot of corruption and social unrest in Guatemala. The police would often search and arrest audience members at rock gigs, as well as many other types of gatherings. On occasion, musicians would go missing and never be found or would be found dead. Another factor was that rock music was mainly produced in English. It took some time for the transition of rock music from English to Spanish to be accepted as rock by the people. Today, the sound of the bands has so much to do with what North America produces, and the only efforts to make something original have been attempts to fuse native elements with a rock sound. A unique case on the scene is the rock band Sobrevivencia from Huehuetenango, whose lyrics are sung in Mam, a Mayan language spoken in the Guatemalan northwest.

In 2011, a new movement was born called El Ritmo de La Paz created by the company Impulsos Creativos. Its main approach was for new or amateur rock bands to compete for the prize of recording their first album with the company and promotion in the media.

13 amateur bands joined the movement and only seven made it to the finals; they played along with professional bands at Parque de la Industria such as Silent Poetry, Conciencia Sublime, Arena Rock, Nova Epica, Bhios (Huehuetenango), Artifice and Metal Requiem.

The winner of the contest was a band called Iridium Mas Alla de Mi Tierra who have been promoted by Impulsos Creativos. They have appeared on national television, and they have been interviewed and their songs played on national radio stations. They are recording their first album as they play numerous concerts.

El Ritmo de La Paz is an annual Rock Festival with a message for the utopian peace that every Guatemalan desires.

== References and further reading ==
- Dieter Lehnhoff, Creación musical en Guatemala. Guatemala City: Editorial Galería Guatemala, 2005. ISBN 99922-704-7-0.
- Hernandez, Deborah Pacini, Héctor Fernández L'Hoeste, and Hector Zolov. Rockin' Las Américas. Pittsburgh, PA: University of Pittsburgh Press, 2004. ISBN 0-8229-5841-4 http://www.upress.pitt.edu/BookDetails.aspx?bookId=35483
