= A Merry Little Christmas (Linda Ronstadt album) =

Studio album by Linda Ronstadt
- Released: October 17, 2000
- Recorded: 2000 Jim Brady Studios in Tucson (Tracks 1–5, 7–8), Recital Halls at the University of Arizona (6–7, 10–14), OceanWay Studios Nashville August 2000 (1–5, 8–9) Capitol Studios (3)
- Genres: Christmas; religious
- Label: Elektra
- Producers: John Boylan, George Massenburg

Linda Ronstadt chronology
Western Wall: The Tucson Sessions (1999)	A Merry Little Christmas (2000)	The Very Best of Linda Ronstadt (2002)

Professional ratings
Review scores
Source	Rating
AllMusic	2.5/5 stars
Entertainment Weekly	A ("4 stockings out of 4")
The Rolling Stone Album Guide	3/5 stars

A Merry Little Christmas is a Christmas album by American singer/songwriter/producer Linda Ronstadt, released in 2000. It was the final release under Ronstadt's recording contract with the Elektra/Asylum Records label for whom Linda had recorded since 1973 (twenty-seven years to that point). John Boylan returned as Linda's producer for this disc. The cover art was designed by Kosh.

Among the highlights of this disc is Ronstadt's duet with the late Rosemary Clooney on the track "White Christmas".

Ronstadt and Elektra differed on the final playing order: "They wanted me to start with 'Chestnuts Roasting On An Open Fire'. I was tired of bargaining with them. I had this scheme where it started with ancient and went to modern. I always like to organize chronologically."

== Track listing ==
No.	Title	Writer(s)	Length
1.	"The Christmas Song"	Mel Tormé, Bob Wells	4:24
2.	"I'll Be Home for Christmas"	Buck Ram, Kim Gannon, Walter Kent	4:15
3.	"White Christmas" (duet with Rosemary Clooney)	Irving Berlin	4:22
4.	"Have Yourself a Merry Little Christmas"	Hugh Martin, Ralph Blane	3:55
5.	"River"	Joni Mitchell	4:10
6.	"O come, O come, Emmanuel"	John Mason Neale	3:29
7.	"Xicochi, Xicochi" ("Sleep, sleep")	Gaspar Fernandez	2:17
8.	"I Wonder as I Wander"	John Jacob Niles, Traditional	3:20
9.	"Away in a Manger"	Traditional	2:08
10.	"Lo, How a Rose E're Blooming"	Traditional	2:10
11.	"Welsh Carol"	Traditional	3:57
12.	"Past Three O'Clock"	George Ratcliffe Woodward, Traditional	0:41
13.	"O magnum mysterium"	Traditional	3:19
14.	"Silent Night"	Josef Mohr	3:06
Total length:			45:33

== Personnel ==
- Linda Ronstadt – vocals
- Jon Gilutin – acoustic piano
- Jim Cox – celesta
- Dean Parks – guitar
- Jim Hughart – bass guitar
- John Guerin – drums
- Brian Kilgore – percussion
- Stephanie Bennett – harp
- Rosemary Clooney – vocals (3)

== Release history ==
Release history and formats for A Merry Little Christmas
Region	Date	Format	Label	Ref.
North America	October 17, 2000	CD; cassette	Elektra Records	
