= Antonio de Salazar (composer) =

Antonio de Salazar (or Zalazar) (c.1650–1715) was a Novohispano composer of the Baroque period.

== Life ==
Salazar was born in Puebla de los Angeles, current Mexico. He was first given the role of maestro de capilla at Puebla Cathedral in July of 1679. This position included skills regarding composition, teaching, and performing. Salazar would give lessons in polyphonic music to the cathedral staff while providing copies of his compositions to the archive. During this time, Salazar was being paid for his composed villancicos and chanzonetas.

Salazar's high-level skills in various musical subjects led to earning the role of maestro de capilla at Mexico City in September of 1688. These skills included both the composition of the motet and villiancico. While in Mexico City, Salazar took charge of reorganizing the cathedral music archive and even assisted in the installation of a new organ built by Jorge de Sesma. In 1698 he turned into the master of the chapel of Puebla Cathedral, then later held his final position at Mexico City Cathedral. It is unknown if he had any direct connection to Oaxaca Cathedral though some of his compositions are found in manuscript there. This may be due to one of Salazar's students, José Pérez de Guzmán, who held a position at Oaxaca Cathedral. Due to poor health, Salazar ended his duties as a teacher of counterpoint in 1710. He died in 1715 in Mexico City.

Salazars compositions were spread throughout New Spain. They can be found in archives in Guatemala, Mexico City, Morelia, Oaxaca, Puebla, and Tepotzotlán.

== Music and Influence ==
In his sacred Latin works Salazar was noted for a strict contrapuntal style harking back to Palestrina. The musicologist Bruno Turner considers that Salazar "represents the last of the truly conservative Hispanic composers before the all-conquering Italian style took Spain and its Empire by storm".

Salazar composed Latin motes, hymns, and villancicos for special feasts. He also composed lighter pieces including Christmas villancicos, including several in the negrillo genre imitating the dialects and dances of African slaves. Salazar wrote sets for the Assumption (1676, 1679, 1685), Conception (1676), and St. Peter (1683).

=== Villancicos ===
Many of Salazar's villancicos remain. His work includes movements based on popular dance and song forms, such as the folía, jácara, kalenda, negro, ensaladilla, and juguete. Many villancicos were composed for special feasts, including five sets to text by Sor Juana Inés de la Cruz. There are references to many instruments within his work, including the clarín, cornett, bajón, violin, chirimía, cítara, tenor, vihuela, rabelillo, bandurria, and harp. Some of these might have been included in Salazar's scores. Within his vernacular works, Salazar showcased his ability at writing "popular semi-theatrical pieces in black dialect."

=== Motets ===
Salazar's use of counterpoint within his Latin works is thoroughly developed. For example, his piece O sacrum convivium uses imitation, antiphonal writing, and animated rhythm to create a desirable musical effect. In Quis Deus magnus, the use of contrasting major and minor modes along with initial upbeats form a distinct sound. The work Inveni David displays a tenor soloist moving between a four-part chorus and two continuo lines, emphasizing Salazar's skill in six-part counterpoint.

== Works ==
=== Motets ===
- Credidi quod locutus sum
- Gloriosa virginum
- Inveni David
- Joseph fili David
- O sacrum convivium
- Quis Deus magnus
- Salve regina
- Te Joseph celebrent
- Vexilla Regis prodeunt

==== Villancicos ====
- Atension, atension
- Digan quien vio tal
- Guarda la fiera
- Oigan un vexamen
- Tarará tarará qui yo soy Antoniyo
- Un ciego que contravajo canta

===== Hymns =====
- Christe sanctorum decus
- Egregie Doctor Paule
