= Gustavo Adolfo Palma =

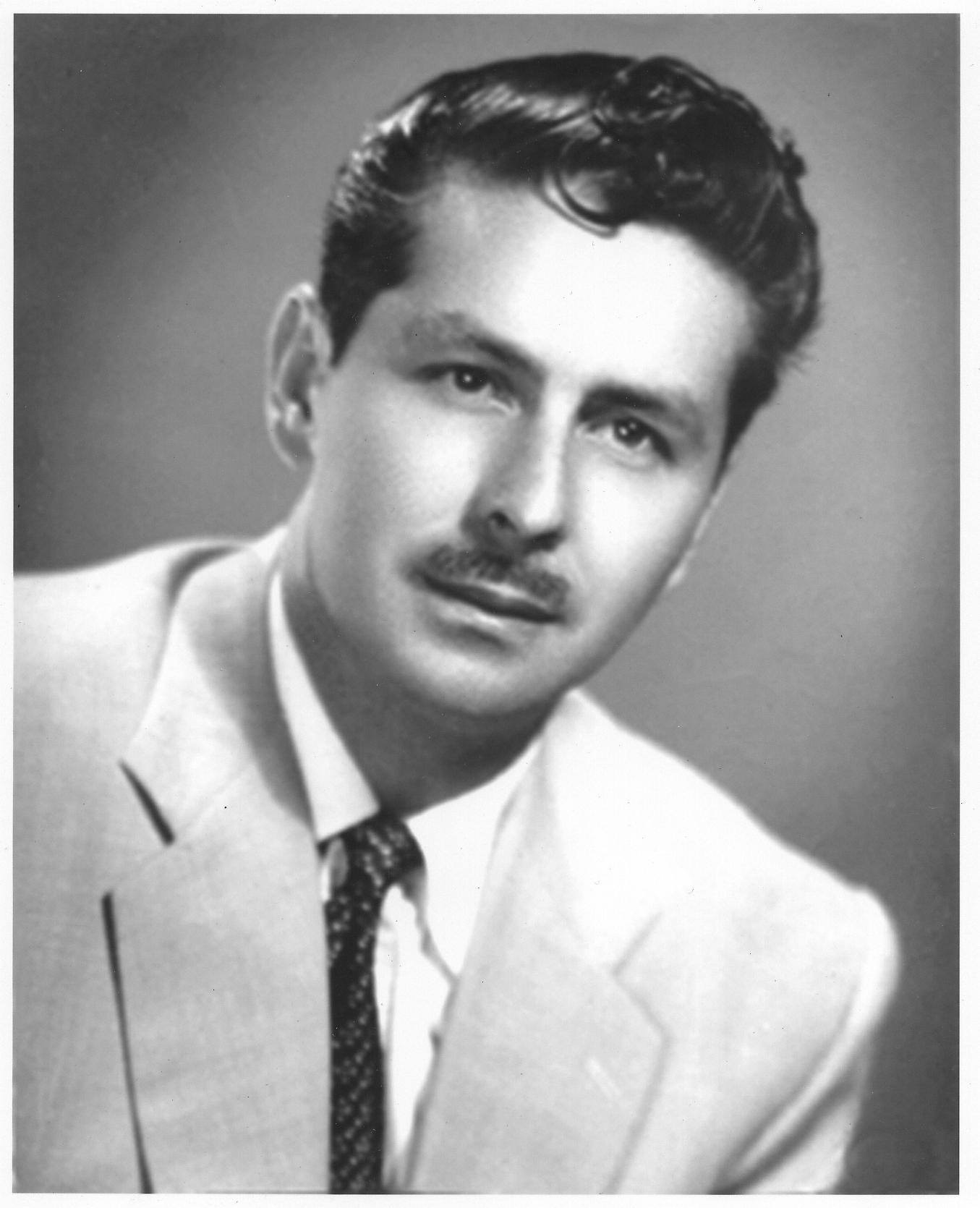
- Gustavo Adolfo Palma

Background information
- Also known as: Tenor of Central America
- Born: 31 August 1920
- Origin: Jutiapa, Guatemala
- Died: 1 December 2009 (aged 89)
- Genres: Romantic music
- Instrument: Vocals
- Years active: 1936 to 1990
- Labels: Sello Palma and DIDECA

Gustavo Adolfo Palma (31 August 1920 – 1 December 2009) was a Guatemalan singer, actor, and lyric tenor between 1936 and 1970, nicknamed "the Tenor of Central America" by Guatemalan radio personality José Flamenco y Cotero.

== Early years ==
Palma's parents were lawyer Cecilio Palma y Palma and Piedad Recinos. When he was seven years old, his family moved to Guatemala City. He soon began to sing in aficionado programs at the Abril Theater.

== Career ==
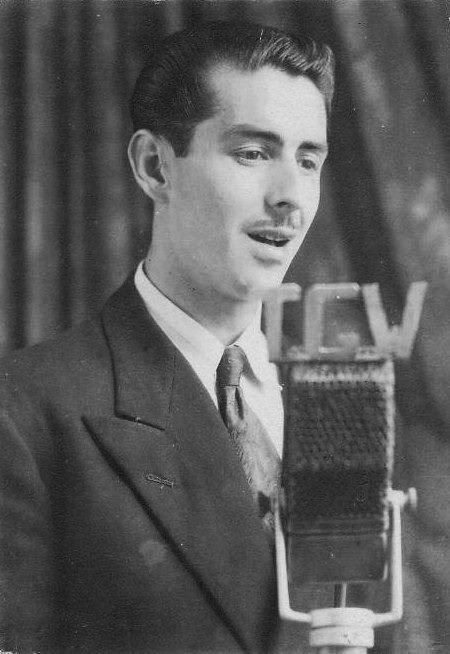
Palma in the recording studios of TGW in 1936.

Gustavo Adolfo Palma made his debut as a professional singer in 1936 with weekly songs on the broadcast radio station TGX. He was a regular singer on the radio during the golden age of Guatemala's state radio station TGW at the age of seventeen. At the age of 20, he was trained in singing by Martha Bolaños de Prado, a noted music teacher who led several singers to great success at that time.

In 1944, Palma participated in the contest "Trip to Mexico," promoted by Mexico's state radio station XEW, which was looking for "the Voice of Latin America"; Palma won first place and was awarded with a professional career in Mexico, where he signed a contract with XEW, shared the music scene with Jorge Negrete, and was accompanied by some of the best broadcast orchestras.

Returning to Guatemala in October 1944, he shared a stage with Pedro Vargas, in the glamorous Salon Granada, located in 6ª Avenue and 11 Street of zone 1 and in 1947, he shared a stage with Pedro Infante in Mansion Victoria of the City of Guatemala. In 1955, he acted in the film "El Cristo Negro" (the Black Christ) with the actors Raúl Martinez and Rosa Carmina. The movie filmed in Guatemala and directed and produced by Jose Baviera, of Spanish nationality. This one forms part of the List of Guatemalan films.

In 1956, he was named "most wanted artist", by popular vote, in a contest promoted by the newspaper Mundo Libre, a testimony to the public's esteem. He recorded with several recording houses of Mexico, as well as "Columbia Records" and "Musart Records". He recorded other Central American discography seals.

In 1964, he participated in the Central American Festival of the Song, in El Salvador, obtaining a prize for his song "Tonight, my Love", composed by Marco Tulio Cordón. In 1970, he was the guest of honor in the First Festival of the Central American and Caribbean Song in Panama. The event was carried out 23, 24 and 25 October . Palma interpreted the song "Contigo" ("With You") of his own inspiration, accompanied by an orchestra conducted by maestro Jorge Sarmiento. In this event he again shared the stage with Pedro Vargas.

Palma was artistically versatile, acting in television, radio, night clubs and theaters across the entire Republic. In Guatemala, he was accompanied by famous orchestras led by conductors such as Miguel Sandoval. In 1982, he was the protagonist of the festival "Broadway '82" performed in the Teatro Nacional of Guatemala, where he shared the stage with a then unknown Ricardo Arjona.

Palma also composed of some romantic songs and in 1976, he was the main protagonist of the photo soap opera called "Maria", acting with other Guatemalan singers, among them Elizabeth of Guatemala. In September 2005 he received a tribute, during the 75 the commemorative acts of anniversary of the TGW.

His last recording, called "Yesterday, Today and Always," was released in 1971.

== See also ==
- Music of Guatemala

== Notes and references ==
=== Bibliography ===
- "Bienvenidos al espacio de Gustavo VII". Gustavo VII (in Spanish). 2006. Archived from the original on 3 March 2012.
- Cuevas, R (2009). "Gustavo Adolfo Palma en portal You Tube". YouTube (in Spanish).
- Cuevas, S (2009). "Gustavo Adolfo Palma". Aquí Guatemala (in Spanish). Guatemala.
- — (2009) [2006]. "Gustavo Adolfo Palma". Esnips.com (in Spanish). Archived from the original on 8 February 2010.
- De Guate (n.d.). "Gustavo Adolfo Palma". deGUATE.com (in Spanish).
- De Guate (2005). "Principian Celebraciones de Bodas de Diamante de TGW". deGuate.com (in Spanish). Archived from the original on 6 December 2012.
- Diario de Centro América (n.d.). "Gustavo Adolfo Palma, el tenor de Centro América". Diario de Centro América (in Spanish). Archived from the original on 21 July 2011.
- Istmania Films (1953). "Gustavo Adolfo Palma canta "Ayer" (en la película El Cristo Negro)". YouTube (in Spanish).
- Lemus, Juan Carlos (7 December 2010). "Gustavo Adolfo Palma, una época" (in Spanish).
- Monsanto, Guillermo (2010). "Tres puntos...: Ernesto Bravo y Gustavo Adolfo Palma". Prensa Libre (in Spanish). Guatemala.
- Palma, Susana (2010). "Gustavo Adolfo Palma, El tenor de Centroamérica". Radio Nuevo Mundo (in Spanish). Guatemala. Archived from the original on 14 July 2011.
- Pérez Lara, José Rodolfo (2009). "Marina Prado Bolyears, La memoria de dos maestras con gran aporte al país". ElPeriódico (in Spanish). Guatemala.
- The Internet Movie Database (1990). "El Cristo Negro (1955)". The Internet Movie Database. Archived from the original on 21 July 2011.
- Universidad de San Carlos de Guatemala (2005). "Historia de la radio en Guatemala". Rincón del Vago (in Spanish).
- Zoconet, S.L. (1997). "Gustavo Adolfo Palma, ayer hoy y siempre, edición Guatemala". Todo Colección (in Spanish).

=== Bibliography ===
- Radio, Cine, Teatro Club (1944). Adiós a Gustavo Adolfo Palma (in Spanish). Talleres Gutenberg.
- Palma y Palma, César Augusto (1979). La Tierra que ya Perdí (in Spanish). Guatemala: publisher Oscar Castillo.
- de León Aragón, Oscar (2003). Memorias de un Estudiante del 44 (in Spanish). Guatemala: publisher Universitaria. p. 79.
- El Imparcial (29 July 1976b). "Fotonovela guatemalteca saldrá a circulación". El Imparcial (in Spanish). Guatemala: 10.
- Prensa Libre (21 June 1973). "Gustavo Adolfo Palma – canciones de ayer, hoy …y siempre !". Prensa Libre (in Spanish). Guatemala: 26.
- Diario de Centro América (3 February 2010). "Gustavo Adolfo Palma, El Tenor de Centroamérica". Diario de Centro América (in Spanish). Guatemala: 13.
