= Piano Concerto No. 1 (Lehnhoff) =

Piano concerto by Dieter Lehnhoff

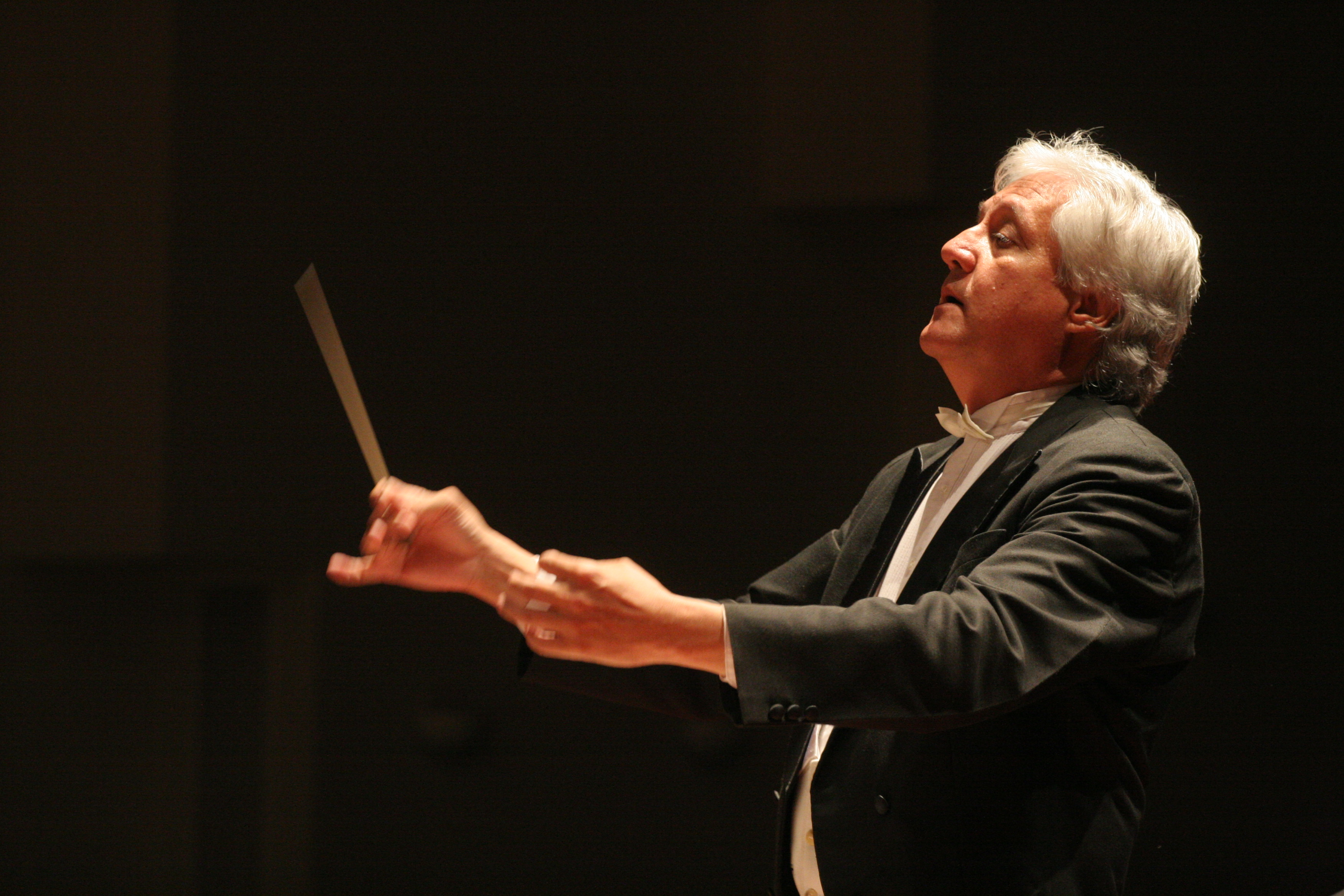
Dieter Lehnhoff conducting

Dieter Lehnhoff composed his Concerto for Piano and Orchestra No. 1 in 2005.

== History ==
After attending a workshop with the students of the Russian pianist, Alexandr Sklioutovski, in San José, Costa Rica, Dieter Lehnhoff was so impressed with the virtuoso level of the young Costa Rican pianists that he immediately sketched out the first movement of the concerto. He completed it in Heredia, where he was guest professor at the National University, in July, 2005. The second movement was written in a few days and completed in Los Angeles, California, where the composer was a keynote speaker at the First World Music Forum of the Unesco International Music Council early in October. The third movement was completed in November in Guatemala. Each movement was composed in full score, of which the composer immediately made a reduction for two pianos.

The concerto had its premiere at the Great Hall of the National Theatre in Guatemala City, on 17 June 2006. The soloist was the young Costa Rican pianist, José Pablo Quesada, with the Millennium Orchestra and the composer conducting. It was first performed in Costa Rica at the National Theatre in San José on 10 May 2007, with José Pablo Quesada as soloist, and the newly established Symphony Orchestra of the National University conducted by Dieter Lehnhoff.

== Music ==
The concerto is scored for a solo piano and an orchestra consisting of the following instruments: 2 flutes, 2 oboes, 2 clarinets, bass clarinet, 2 bassoons, 2 French horns, 2 trumpets, timpani, xylophone, percussion (triangle, suspended cymbal, cymbals), and strings.

There are three movements:

1. Allegro
2. Andantino
3. Rapsodia
