= Xicochi =

Motet by Gaspar Fernandes

"Xicochi" is a 17th-century motet, written by Gaspar Fernandes while he was organist of Puebla Cathedral. It serves as an example of the influence of indigenous Nahua culture, dominant in Mesoamerica at the time, on colonial Spanish music.

In 2000, Linda Ronstadt recorded the song for A Merry Little Christmas.

== Lyrics ==
=== Nahuatl original ===
Xicochi, xicochi,
Xicochi, xicochi
Xicochi conetzintle
Xicochi conetzintle
Ca omizhuihuixoco in angelosme
Ca omizhuihuixoco in angelosme
Ca omizhuihuixoco in angelosme
In angelosme in angelosme

Alleluya alleluya

=== English translation ===
Sleep, sleep
Sleep, sleep
Sleep, precious baby
Sleep, precious baby
Indeed, the angels have come here to rock you to sleep
Indeed, the angels have come here to rock you to sleep
Indeed, the angels have come here to rock you to sleep

Alleluia, alleluia

== Sources ==
- Watkins, Timothy D. "Finding Nahua Influence in Spanish Colonial Music." Rhodes College. Hassell Hall. 24 September 2008.
