= José de Cascante =

Colombian composer and organist (ca.1618–1702)

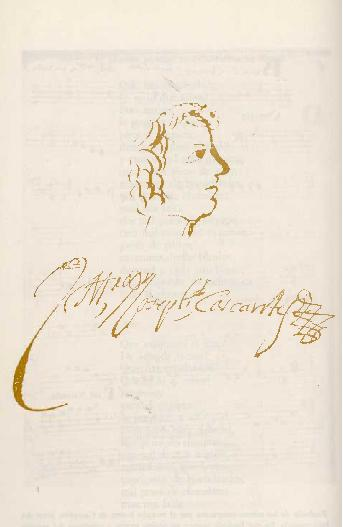
Caricature of José de Cascante, from the manuscript of one of his works.

José Cascante, José de Cascante or Joseph Cascante (ca. 1618-1630 – December 1702) was a Colombian Baroque composer and organist.

== Biography ==
Born in Bogotá, he was appointed in 1646 as the maestro de capilla of that city's cathedral for many years, until his death, and oversaw the installation of its organ. His output consisted of villancicos; his work was important for native Americans and immigrants to develop popular genres later in history, such as the bambuco, the torbellino, the guabina, the pasillo, the danza, and the contradanza, among others.
