= Luna de Xelajú =

1944 Guatemalan waltz by Paco Pérez

"Luna de Xelajú" is a popular Guatemalan waltz composed by Paco Pérez in 1944.

The title translates as "moon of Xelajú". "Xelajú" (pronounced sheh-lah-HOO) is the Kʼicheʼ Maya name for the Guatemalan city Quetzaltenango, popularly called "Xelajú", or "Xela".

The song was written to Eugenia Cohen, with whom the author was in a relationship but who eventually left him, because her parents disapproved.

Despite the specific context in which the song was written, it is sometimes referred to as Guatemala's second national anthem.

The song has been performed by several musical acts, including Guatemalan singer and Grammy Award-winner Gaby Moreno. In 2023, she recorded a collaboration with actor Oscar Isaac, which was released as a single and included on her album X Mí (Vol. 1).

== Song lyrics ==
The following are the song's lyrics, although it is frequently performed instrumentally:

Luna gardenia de plata Que mi serenata te vuelves canción Tú que me viste cantando Me ves hoy llorando mi desilusión Calles bañadas de luna Que fueron la cuna de mi juventud Vengo a cantarle a mi amada Mi luna plateada de mi Xelajú Vengo a cantarle a mi amada Mi luna plateada de mi Xelajú

Luna de Xelajú Que supiste alumbrar En mis noches de pena Por una morena de dulce mirar Luna de Xelajú me diste inspiración La canción que hoy te canto Regada con llanto de mi corazón

En mi vida no habrá Más cariño que tú Por que no eres ingrata Mi luna de plata Luna de Xelajú Luna que me alumbró En mis noches de amor Hoy consuelas la pena Por una morena Que me abandonó

== Popular culture ==
"Luna de Xelajú" became a favorite among Macintosh users in the mid-1990s, with the release of a novelty application called "Jared, the Butcher of Song", written and published by Freeverse Software. In the app, an 8-bit rendering of a smiley face attempts to sing the song, with light guitar accompaniment.
