= Grupo Rana =

Guatemalan merengue group

- Origin: Tecpán Guatemala
- Genres: Salsa, Merengue
- Years active: 1974-present
- Labels: DIDECA, Anfibio Producciones Guatemala
- Past members: Marco Tulio; Ovidio Girón; Eduardo Carrillo; Armando Rodríguez; Ottoniel Ramos; Enrique Contreras; Humberto De León
- Website: Official website

Grupo Rana is a merengue group founded in Tecpán Guatemala. Currently based in Guatemala City it enjoys great popularity throughout Central America and the Caribbean. At that time Rana was formed by six musicians, among them its founders Marco Tulio and Ovidio Girón, Eduardo Carrillo, Armando Rodríguez, Ottoniel Ramos and Humberto De León. They were based in Tecpán, Chimaltenango. Due to the success achieved, its founders decided to increase the number of members and formed a band of 13 musicians, with which they began to massify their music. In the mid-1980s, the group consolidated and became one of the most emblematic bands in the national scene, with songs such as "Colegiala", "Colombia Rock", and "Socaribe", among other topics loaded with rhythms Tropical product mix of Soca and Merengue.

In 1985, the group secured a contract with Central Records (DIDECA) and recorded their first full-length album titled Aquí, Rana El Grupo. That same year they achieved great success with more hits such as Colombia Rock, No Sonríes, El Mangú and Patacón Pisao, allowing it to be considered one of the best groups from Central America and Guatemala. In 1986 they released their third full-length: De La Cabeza a Los Pies, containing hits such as Esa Chica, Oye Muchacha and Sentimiento Nacional.

Thanks to public acceptance, the charisma of its members and the joy they transmitted and still transmit, at the end of 1990, they captured in the acetate "Así es Rana" the themes: “Mi secretaria”, “Una entre mil”, “Aventurero” y “Maribel”. One of the characteristics of this album is that its eight songs were unpublished and bear the stamp of originality and creativity of Ovid.

Currently the group is formed by 12 members, considered as the precursor of the tropical genre in Guatemala.
