= Paco Pérez (musician) =

Portrait of Pérez

Francisco "Paco" Pérez Muñoz (25 April 1916 – 27 October 1951) was a Guatemala singer, composer, and guitarist.

== Biography ==
Pérez was born on 25 April 1916, in Huehuetenango, Guatemala to José Pérez and Luz Muñoz. At the age of 6, he acted in the municipal theater. In 1927, he moved with his family to Quetzaltenango, where he took on various roles as a singer and orator.

Pérez made his grand debut in 1935 in the municipal theater of Quetzaltenango, accompanied by Juan Sandoval on piano. Later he formed the Trío Quetzaltecos with Manolo Rosales and José Alvarez. When Quetzaltenango radio station TGQ launched in 1937, he aired a series of concerts. Pérez achieved fame for his waltz Luna de Xelajú (1944), which has become part of the Guatemalan cultural identity. The song figures in the repertory of most singers, choirs, marimba players and musical groups in Guatemala.

Pérez died on 27 October 1951, in a plane crash in El Petén, Guatemala, along with his pianist, Mario Lara Montealegre, and other musicians. He was 34 years old.

== Works ==
- Luna de Xelajú
- Tzanjuyú
- Azabia
- Nenita
- Arrepentimiento
- Patoja linda
- Madrecita
- Chichicastenango (guaracha)
