= Rafael Antonio Castellanos =

Guatemalan classical composer

Rafael Antonio Castellanos (c. 1725–1791) was a Guatemalan classical composer. His style is that of the late Spanish baroque, pre-classical, and classical periods, with frequent reference to Guatemalan folk music idioms.

== Life ==
From an early age, Castellanos trained as an apprentice under his uncle Manuel José de Quirós, chapelmaster of the cathedral of Santiago de Guatemala. In 1740, the young Rafael signed a composition for voice and basso continuo, on the Latin text of the Second Lamentation of Jeremiah. This piece reflects his mastery of baroque writing and an unusual expressive talent.

In 1745 he became a journeyman and was admitted as a member of the cathedral orchestra as first violin, sometimes also playing harp. During the 1750s he produced various of his own compositions for the matins services, along with those of his uncle. When Quirós died in 1765, Castellanos was appointed his successor as chapel master, with the duties of conducting cathedral music during matins, vespers, and Mass, and of composing suitable music for different liturgical occasions.

After the earthquake of 1773 life changed dramatically in the City of Santiago de Guatemala, which would shortly move to the site of present-day Guatemala City by order of King Charles III of Spain. After 1775 the city would be known as Antigua Guatemala. Castellanos remained loyal to the Archbishop, Pedro Cortés y Larraz, and only left with his musicians, the clergy, and the religious orders when they were forced to do so, arriving at the new site in November 1779. Despite the hardship of his new life, Castellanos kept up his work, composing four or five works every year. Among his pupils, several became able composers, such as Manuel Silvestre Pellegeros and Pedro Nolasco Estrada Aristondo, his eventual successor as maestro de capilla.

== Works ==
One hundred seventy-six of his works are extant and have been catalogued. Some of them have been transcribed into modern score for performance and recording. All of his output is vocal, with villancicos and cantatas for different feasts of the Catholic liturgical calendar, as well as sacred works on Latin texts.

Several of his compositions are available on CD, performed by Cristina Altamira and the Millennium Ensemble.
