= José Eulalio Samayoa =

José Eulalio Samayoa (c. 1781 – c. 1866) was a Guatemalan classical composer.

== Biography ==
José Eulalio Samayoa was educated within the system of guilds, progressing from apprentice to journeyman before becoming a master. He founded the Philharmonic Society of the Sacred Heart of Jesus, with a series of musical and liturgical celebrations held on July 2, 1813. The same day he was admitted to the Guatemala Cathedral choir, as third tenor, which he regarded as a heavenly grace for having established the Philharmonic Society. In 1842 he wrote the history of this Society, with an extended historical appendix on the development of Music in Guatemala since the earliest days of the Spanish missions, thus becoming the first music historian in Central America and perhaps all of Latin America.

Samayoa is one of the first composers in the Americas to attempt the composition of larger instrumental forms that culminates in the symphony. Having been trained in the tradition of Spanish church music, he was taught how to write well for voices with instrumental accompaniment. The resulting forms, mainly those of the villancico and cantata, were defined by the poetic form of the text. When the Cathedral chapter decided in 1804 that vernacular matins texts were not up to the standard, chapel master Vicente Sáenz tried to remedy the situation by substituting villancicos for movements of concertos by Antonio Vivaldi and menuets from symphonies by Joseph Haydn. Samayoa however was of the opinion that a new instrumental music of local invention and flavour should be used, and so he started with short pieces called "sones" that were part of the culture of the local Indians. Studying Haydn, he taught himself European instrumental forms, writing first his brief "Tocatas", and then expanding to ever larger movements, until he was able to sustain his musical discourse in full-fledged symphonies. The oldest extant work in this form is his Seventh Symphony finished in June, 1834, which he dedicated to the victory of the Federal Army at the battle of Jiquilisco, in present-day El Salvador. It is structured, as would be expected, in four movements: allegro, andante, minuet, and a fast finale with programmatic elements such as a stylized military march and a "son." It is scored for strings with pairs of oboes and horns. Two later symphonies, the "Sinfonía cívica" and the "Sinfonía Histórica" demand larger orchestral forces in expanded movements.

== Works ==
Orchestral: Three extant symphonies: Symphony No. 7, dedicated to the victory of the Federal Army at Xiquilisco; "Sinfonía Cívica"; "Sinfonía Histórica"; "Piezas para tocarse en la Iglesia," for larger orchestra; "Piezas de Iglesia," for small orchestra; "Tocatas de Iglesia", for strings and two horns.

Chamber: "Tocatas" for string trio.

Vocal-choral: 8 Masses, including "Misa del Señor San José", for three-part chorus and orchestra; "Servicio de difuntos" (Requiem); music for funerary services; music for vespers; and villancicos for matins.
