= Bohemia Suburbana =

Guatemalan alternative rock band

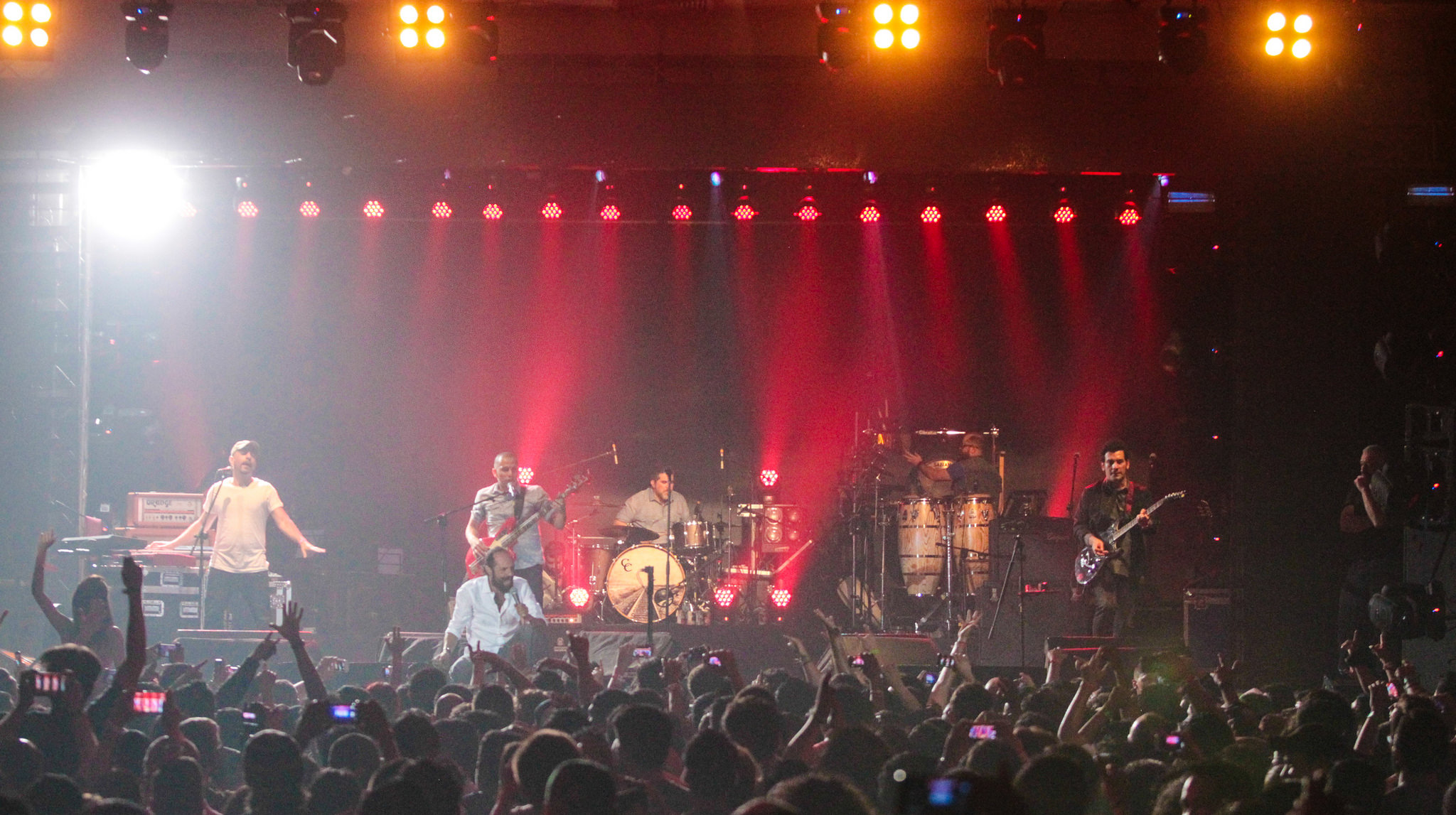
- Bohemia Suburbana live 2015

Background information
- Origin: Guatemala City, Guatemala
- Genres: Latin rock, alternative rock
- Years active: 1992–present
- Labels: Primera Generación Records, RadioVox, Strip Records, Warner Music Latina
- Members: Giovanni Pinzón; Juancarlos Barrios; José Pedro Mollinedo; Josué García
- Website: bohemiasuburbana.net

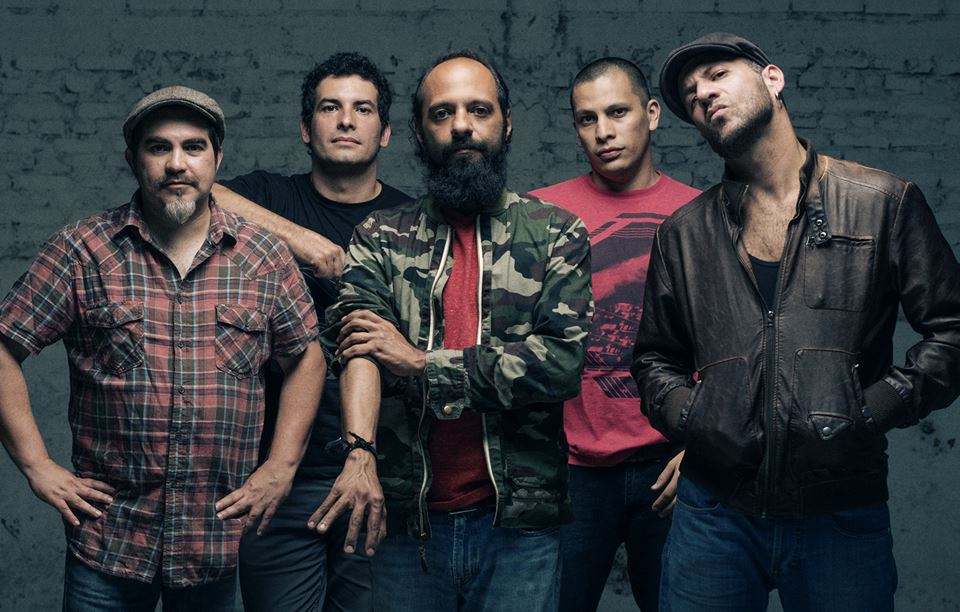
Bohemia Suburbana 2014

Bohemia Suburbana is a Guatemalan alternative rock band formed in the year 1992. Current members are Giovanni Pinzón (vocals), Juancarlos Barrios (guitar), José Pedro Mollinedo (drums) and Josué García (Bass). They have played in a variety of places across the United States, including New York, New Jersey, Connecticut, Maryland, Virginia, Washington, Houston, Dallas, Los Angeles and Puerto Rico. They have also performed in Costa Rica, El Salvador, Honduras and Guatemala.

Bohemia Suburbana has shared stages with musicians like Red Hot Chili Peppers, Incubus, Molotov, Matisyahu, Calle 13, Juanes, Joaquín Sabina, Héroes del Silencio, Jaguares, Rata Blanca, King Changó, Café Tacuba, Desorden Público, Fito Páez, Charly Garcia and Aterciopelados.

After the Latin Grammy Awards nomination for Best Rock Album in 2010, the group recorded their fifth studio album: Imaginaria Sonora, a record with the supposed freshness needed to please the original audience, and to bring in new fans.

== History ==
=== 1990s: Sombras En El Jardín and Mil Palabras Con Sus Dientes ===
Bohemia Suburbana was formed in Guatemala City in March, 1992. The band was founded by Guatemalans Juancarlos Barrios (guitar), José Pedro Mollinedo (drums), Giovanni Pinzón (vocals) and the Colombian Juan Luis Lopera (bass). In 1993, the band released their first album, entitled Sombras en el Jardín, as an audio cassette, under the record label Primera Generación Records. In 1994, Peruvian keyboardist and rhythm guitarist Álvaro Rodriguez joined the band. In the same year, Primera Generación Records responded to the band's growing popularity by releasing a compact disc of Sombras en el Jardín.

In 1994, Mollinedo left the group and the Guatemalan Alex Lobos joined the band. In 1995, Bohemia Suburbana traveled to Miami, Florida, to record and produce their next album. The album, Mil Palabras Con Sus Dientes, was released under the RadioVox label. The album included the tracks "Yo Te Vi" and "Peces e Iguanas." The album's popularity exposed Bohemia Suburbana to audiences outside of Guatemala and Central America. The song "Peces e Iguanas" became a radio hit. On the heels of the album's release, Bohemia Suburbana embarked on a tour that included shows in Guatemala, Central America, Puerto Rico, and cities in the United States. The album features a wide array of sub-genres from within the wider genre of rock, including grunge, folk rock, hard rock, blues rock and alternative rock.

In 1996, Alex Lobos left the group. In 1997, under the stress and economic pressure of poor management, the group stopped playing, and each member pursued his own projects. The band reunited in 1999 to play a reunion concert. At the same time, under the title Remixes y La Emergencia de las Circunstancias, RadioVox released a disc that included electronic versions of Bohemia's songs, composed by Juancarlos Barrios during the band's recess. The reunion concert, which broke attendance records in Guatemala, took place in la vieja plaza de toros in Guatemala City.

With the success of the concert, the group decided to stay together and record new material. With the earnings from the concert, the band traveled to Madrid, Spain, to spend time together and study Spanish musical styles. During this time, Juancarlos Barrios left Bohemia Suburbana, and the band returned to Guatemala to regroup.

=== 2000s: Sub and Bohemia Suburbana ===
In 2001, Bohemia Suburbana released a new album entitled Sub. The album was self-produced and released under the label Strip Records. Álvaro Rodriguez became lead guitarist and the band brought in Guatemalan Rudy Bethancourt to play keyboards and rhythm guitar. Moreover, Colombian Alejandro Duque (Aterciopelados) became the drummer. The band toured in Guatemala, Central America and the United States. The band also record a music video for the song "El Grito."

In March 2002, Bohemia Suburbana celebrated its tenth anniversary by playing a series of concerts throughout Guatemala. These concerts were recorded, and some of the material was released as an album in 2003, entitled Aqui Diez Años...En Vivo!, under the Strip Records label. The album included new versions of the songs "En el Jardín" and "Bolsas de Té."

With the advent of digital downloads, the band found it difficult to maintain its economic viability, and in 2004 the band went on hiatus to pursue personal projects and devote time to their personal lives.

In May 2007, with the support of a Guatemalan producer and old friends of the band, Bohemia Suburbana reunited in Miami, Florida. Over the following month, the band composed and recorded material for a new album. At the beginning of 2008, the band played a series of concerts in Puerto Rico. Afterwards, the band decided to focus on the composing and recording of new material.

The band's fourth studio album, the self-titled Bohemia Suburbana, released in January 2010 by Warner Music Latina, was nominated for Best Rock Album at the 2010 Latin Grammys, but lost to Gustavo Cerati's Fuerza Natural.

=== 2015: Imaginaria Sonora ===
In 2015, Bohemia Suburbana got together to record their fifth album. They got the attention of the renowned producer Phil Vinall, who traveled to Guatemala to record some songs and then, the band went for a few weeks to Sonic Ranch studios in Texas for the final arrangements of Imaginaria Sonora.

Imaginaria Sonora is their fifth studio album of Bohemia Suburbana: a journey to the roots of the band and a leap into the future. The twelve songs were the result of a process of collective creation among Giovanni Pinzón, Álvaro Rodríguez, Pepe Mollinedo, Juancarlos Barrios and Josué García, who in addition to being good friends, are professional musicians and music lovers. The result is according to Pinzón: "A rock-and- roll eclectic proposal; an updated version of Bohemia."

Phil Vinall, renowned producer of bands like Placebo, Zoé, Enjambre, Radiohead and Pulp, received a demo of the band, and traveled to Guatemala to work with them. "Phil made us turn around the songs, try different things and not use the rock clichés, or the resources we usually used," recalls Juan Carlos Barrios.

Dan Zlotnik (brasses) and Cuarteto Asturias (strings) were part of the guest musicians who participated in Imaginaria Sonora. Mix was done by Manny Calderon (Hello Seahorse, Bunbury) and Phil Vinall at Sonic Ranch Studios located in El Paso, Texas, just half a kilometer from the wall dividing the United States from Mexico. Harris Newman of Gray Market Mastering was in charge of mastering in Montreal Canada.

Bohemia Suburbana is influenced by classic rock and incorporates space, analog, and electronic sounds, achieving a fresh mature and very danceable proposal. Álvaro Rodríguez, explains: "We're getting interesting sounds. You will hear some folk, punk, soul, progressive and other subgenres. Bohemia makes music that will transport you through time. It is the result of our experimentation with genres, rhythms, lyrics, and musical instruments."

Pinzón's social lyrics, criticism of humanistic and poetry, at times introspective and romantic, absorbs the Guatemalan volcanic essence, accompanies the migrant that crosses the desert, Latin American living traditions and explores Xibalba's myths.

In 2020, Bohemia Suburbana released their new album “Santiago 14º 91º” to favorable reviews. It expands on the sound and experimentation that they explored in their previous album and was also produced by well-known producer Phil Vinall.

== Discography ==
=== Studio albums ===
- Sombras en el jardín (1994)
- Mil Palabras con sus dientes (1997)
- Remixes y la Emergencia de la Circunstancia (2000)
- Sub (2001)
- Bohemia Suburbana (2010)
- Imaginaria Sonora (2015)
- Santiago 14°91° (2020)
- Frecuencia Hormigo (2022)
- Fiel a la Miel (2025)

=== Live albums ===
- Aquí Diez Años... En Vivo! (2003)
- Epopeya Sub (2018)

== Videography ==
- Tengo Que Llegar
- Mal Sabor
- Pero Nadie
