= Ignacio de Jerusalem =

Italian violinist and composer

Ignacio de Jerusalem (3 June 1707 - 15 December 1769) was a composer of Novohispanic Baroque music.

Jerusalem was born Ignazio Gerusalemme on June 3, 1707 in Lecce, Italy. His father was Matteo Gerusalemme, a Neapolitan who had moved to Lecce in 1689 to become chapel master. One of eleven children, Jerusalem studied the violin extensively in Italy before moving in 1732 to the Spanish port city of Cádiz. Establishing himself as a virtuoso of the instrument, he performed regularly at the Coliseo de Cádiz, the city's preeminent theatre. Jerusalem was soon known as the "musical marvel" for his uncanny musical talents.

In 1742, Josef Cárdenas, the administrator of the Royal Hospital of Indigenous Citizens in Mexico City, arrived in Cádiz to recruit talent for the Coliseo de México, a theatre whose proceeds supported the hospital. Cárdenas reasoned that better talent would lead to bigger theatre audiences and more funds for the hospital. He persuaded a number of music and dance talents, including Jerusalem, to return to Mexico City with him to perform at the theatre.

Jerusalem began directing the musical activities at the Coliseo de México soon after he arrived. By 1746, he was earning commissions from the Catedral de México and teaching at the Colegio de Infantes (Infants College). In 1749, the cathedral ended the tenure of its lackluster chapel master, Domingo Dutra, and announced it would seek a more able leader. Jerusalem auditioned for the post. The jury, steeped in traditional musical forms, resisted the modernity and eclecticism of his compositions but ultimately confirmed him as the new chapel master on November 3, 1750, a position Jerusalem held for the rest of his life.

The following decade proved tumultuous for Jerusalem: he became embroiled in a lawsuit with the tenant of the Coliseo, Joseph Calvo; his estranged wife, Doña Antonia de Estrada, petitioned the cathedral to garner his wages; he used his position to prevent musicians in other parishes from taking job opportunities from musicians in his parish; and he acquired a professional rival in Matheo Tollis della Rocca, who later succeeded Jerusalem as chapel master.

Yet Jerusalem counted a number of triumphs during this time: he modernized musical notation by cathedral copyists; he improved the quality of texts used in compositions of sacred music; he more than doubled the size of the cathedral orchestra; and he composed prolifically.

When he died on December 15, 1769, Jerusalem was highly esteemed by his colleagues and the musical community of Mexico City. Along with other mid-century transplants from Spain, Jerusalem helped establish the Italianate galant style in Mexico, displacing older Spanish-style music; contrary to popular belief, he did not pay any attention to the native folk songs and instruments of Mexico. His compositions circulated widely throughout New Spain (present-day Mexico) and Guatemala, reaching as far north as the California missions, where it found a place alongside the much simpler "California mission style" music.
