= Villancico =

Poetic and musical form, 15–18th century

The villancico (Spanish, pronounced [biʎanˈθiko]) or vilancete (Portuguese, pronounced [vilɐ̃ˈsetɨ]) was a common poetic and musical form of the Iberian Peninsula and Latin America popular from the late 15th to 18th centuries. Important composers of villancicos were Juan del Encina, Pedro de Escobar, Francisco Guerrero, Manuel de Zumaya, Juana Inés de la Cruz, Gaspar Fernandes, and Juan Gutiérrez de Padilla.

Derived from medieval dance forms, the 15th century Spanish villancico was a type of popular song sung in the vernacular and frequently associated with rustic themes. The poetic form of the Spanish villancico was that of an estribillo (or refrain) and coplas (stanzas), with or without an introduction. While the exact order and number of repetitions of the estribillo and coplas varied, the most typical form was a loose ABA framework, often in triple meter.

The villancico developed as a secular polyphonic genre until religious villancicos gained popularity in the second half of the 16th century in Spain and its colonies in Latin America. These devotional villancicos, which were sung during matins of the feasts of the Catholic calendar, became extremely popular in the 17th century and continued in popularity until the decline of the genre in the 18th and 19th centuries. Its texts were sometimes didactic, designed to help the new converts understand and enjoy the new religion.

The service of matins was structured in three nocturnes, each with three readings and responsories. Thus, during each matins service nine villancicos could be performed, or at least eight if the last responsory was substituted by the Te Deum, a hymn of thanksgiving reserved for the high feasts. An enormous number of villancicos were written in the Spanish world for such feasts as the Immaculate Conception, Christmas, Epiphany, Corpus Christi, Ascension, Assumption, and other occasions of the Catholic liturgical year. Others were written for important saints' days such as Santiago (St. James), St. Peter and Paul, St. Cecilia, and St. Rose of Lima. In colonial Mexico, villancicos were performed before mass on special feast days as part of a theatrical spectacle that served as lighthearted, comical entertainment which drew large crowds from all sectors of society and included ornate costuming and stage effects to accompany the musical numbers and spoken dialogue. Some have argued that it was the juxtaposition of these disparate, incongruent elements—the sacred against the profane, the refined against the vulgar, the high against the low—that gave the villancico its mass popularity.

While the villancico in Spain and its American colonies generally share a common history of development, the Latin American villancico tradition is particularly known for its incorporation of dialects and rhythms drawn from its diverse ethnic population. The texts were mostly in Spanish, but some employed pseudo-African, Náhuatl, or corrupt Italian, French, or Portuguese words.

Frequently named after the ethnic group that was characterized in the lyrics, these humorous songs were often accompanied by non-orchestral, "ethnic" instruments, such as rattles, tambourines, bagpipes, and gourds, while the lyrics mimicked the speech patterns of these groups. For example, villancicos called "negro" or "negrillo", imitated African speech patterns and used onomatopoeic phrases such as, "gulungú, gulungú" and "he, he, he cambabé!" possibly to invoke a childlike and uneducated stereotype of that marginalized group. Other negrillo lyrics, however, offer intriguing fraternal sentiments, such as the negro for Jan. 31, 1677 by the famed villancico poet Sor Juana Inés de la Cruz, which sings "tumba, la-lá-la, tumba la-lé-le/wherever Peter enters, no one remains a slave". Other examples of "ethnic" villancicos include the jácara, gallego, and tocotín.

Villancico composers, who typically held positions as maestro de capilla (chapel master) at the major cathedrals in Spain and the New World, wrote in many different Renaissance and Baroque styles, including homophony, imitative polyphony, and polychoral settings. Among the most outstanding New World composers of villancicos are José de Loaiza y Agurto, Manuel de Sumaya, and Ignacio Jerúsalem in New Spain; Manuel José de Quirós and Rafael Antonio Castellanos, in Guatemala; José Cascante, in Colombia; and Juan de Araujo and Tomás de Torrejón y Velasco, in Peru.

== Portuguese type ==
This type of poem has a mote—the beginning of the poem, which functions, when in music, as a refrain—followed by one or more intervening stanzas—the volta, copla or glosa—each one with 7 lines. The difference between the vilancete and the cantiga depends on the number of lines in the mote: if there are 2 or 3 it is a vilancete, if there are 4 or more it is a cantiga. Each line of a vilancete is usually divided in five or seven metric syllables ("old measure"). When the last line of the mote is repeated at the end of each stanza, the vilancete is "perfect".

Here is an example of a Portuguese vilancete, written by Luís de Camões:

Original

(Mote:)
Enforquei minha Esperança;
Mas Amor foi tão madraço,
Que lhe cortou o baraço.

(Volta:)
Foi a Esperança julgada
Por setença da Ventura
Que, pois me teve à pendura,
Que fosse dependurada:
Vem Cupido com a espada,
Corta-lhe cerce o baraço.
Cupido, foste madraço.

English Translation

(Mote:)
I hanged my Hope;
But Love was so knavish
He cut off the noose.

(Volta:)
Hope was condemned
By verdict of Fate
To be hanged for having me
Hanging out with her
Then comes Cupid with the sword
And cuts the noose short.
O Cupid, you were knavish.

This poem has a common rhyme scheme, ABB CDDC CBB. The theme of this type of villancico was usually about the saudade, about the countryside and the shepherds, about 'the perfect woman' and about unrequited love and consequent suffering. Iberian poets were strongly influenced by Francesco Petrarca, an Italian poet.
