= Manuel José de Quirós =

Guatemalan composer

Manuel José de Quirós (died 1765) was an 18th-century Guatemalan composer.

== Life ==
Born in Santiago de Guatemala, present day Antigua Guatemala, towards the end of the 17th century, Quirós had a religious education while pursuing his musical apprenticeship and reaching the level of a journeyman. Having taken Franciscan orders, he was put in charge of the Franciscan press, where he served until 1738, when he was appointed chapel master of the cathedral choir and orchestra. He served in this capacity for 27 years, until his death in 1765. As chapel master, he was in charge of the education of choir boys and apprentices, besides conducting the cathedral liturgical music. Among his pupils, the most outstanding was Rafael Antonio Castellanos.

Quirós is the first musician in the New World to receive a critical review. On the occasion of the ceremonies that elevated the Bishopric of Guatemala to the rank of an Archbishopric, Quirós provided liturgical music during the nine days of celebration in November, 1745. Writer Antonio de Paz y Salgado, a high official in the Spanish colonial government, published his enthusiastic review of these musical performances two years later in Mexico City.

A considerable number of Quirós' works are contained in the archive at Guatemala Cathedral.

== Works ==
Besides arranging a sizable amount of music sent from Spain, Lima, and Mexico City, Quirós also provided a number of original villancicos, sacred songs, and cantatas for matins of different feasts of the Catholic year:

- Cándidos cisnes, solo voice, continuo
- Oigan una xacarilla, solo voice, continuo
- Una escuela de muchachos, 4 voices, horns, violins and continuo
- Venid, venid a las aras de Dios y de Juan, solo voice, continuo
- Yo la tengo de cantar, solo voice, continuo
- Cantad, gilguerillos, 2 treble voices, continuo
- Clarines suaves, 2 treble voices, continuo
- Jesús, Jesús, y lo que subes (1743), 2 treble voices, continuo
- Hoy que en las sacras aras, 2 voices, continuo
- Oh admirable sacramento, 2 voices, continuo
- Vagelillo que al viento, 2 voices, 2 violins, continuo
- Ay niña bella, 2 voices, continuo
- Joseph Antonio, tus dos nombres, 2 voices, continuo
- Oigan los triunfos de Domingo Santo, 2 voices, continuo
- Qué bien, chorus, continuo
- Ay Jesús, chorus, continuo
- A el pan de los cielos den adoraciones, chorus, continuo
- Lucid fragante rosa, chorus, continuo (1741)
- Un hombre Dios, 4 voices, continuo
- Luz a luz, y gracia a gracia
- El baratillo (1758)

Liturgical works on Latin texts

- Cor mundum, voice, two violins, continuo
- Liberame, voice, two violins, continuo
- Auditi meo, two choirs, continuo
- Ne recorderis, chorus, continuo
- Iod manum suam, solo voice, continuo
- Parce mihi Domine, two choirs, continuo
- Laudate pueri Dominum, SATB chorus, 2 violins, continuo
- Sanctus Deus (1760), chorus, continuo

Negrillos

- Digo a Siola Negla (1736)
- Pues que de pascuas estamos (1745)
- Amotinados los negros
- Jesuclisa Magdalena (1745)
- Vengo turo flanciquillo (1746)
