= Gaspar Fernandes =

Portuguese-Mexican composer and organist

Gaspar Fernandes (sometimes written Gaspar Fernández, the Spanish version of his name) (1566–1629) was a Portuguese-Mexican composer and organist active in the cathedrals of Santiago de Guatemala (present-day Antigua Guatemala) and Puebla de los Ángeles, New Spain (present-day Mexico).

== Life ==
Most scholars agree that the Gaspar Fernandes listed as a singer in the cathedral of Évora, Portugal, is the same person as the Gaspar Fernández who was hired on 16 July 1599 as organist and organ tuner of the cathedral of Santiago de Guatemala. In 1606, Fernandes was approached by the dignitaries of the cathedral of Puebla, inviting him to become the successor of his recently deceased friend Pedro Bermúdez as chapel master. He left Santiago de Guatemala on 12 July 1606, and began his tenure in Puebla on 15 September. He remained there until his death in 1629.

== Work ==
One of his most important achievements for posterity was the compilation and binding in 1602 of various choir books containing Roman Catholic liturgical polyphony, several of which are extant in Guatemala. These manuscripts contain music by Spanish composers Francisco Guerrero, Cristóbal de Morales, and Pedro Bermúdez; the latter was with Fernandes at the time in the cathedral of Guatemala. To complete these books, Fernandes composed a cycle of 8 Benedicamus Domino, the versicle that follows the Magnificat at vespers and certain Masses, one in each of the 8 ecclesiastical tones or modes. He also added his own setting of the Magnificat in the fifth tone, some faux bordon versicles without text, and a vespers hymn for the Feast of the Guardian Angels.

During his Puebla tenure, rather than focusing on the composition of Latin liturgical music, he contributed a sizable amount of vernacular villancicos for matins. This part of his output shows great variety in the handling of texts, which are in Spanish but also in pseudo-African dialects and Amerindian languages and occasionally Portuguese. One of these villancicos, "Xicochi," is notable for its use of Nahuatl, the language of the indigenous Nahua people. The music departs from 16th century counterpoint and reflects the new baroque search for textual expression. The main collection of these villancicos is extant in the Oaxaca Codex, and has been studied, edited, and published by Robert Stevenson and especially by Aurelio Tello.
