= Pedro Bermúdez =

Spanish composer and chapel master

Pedro Bermúdez (1558–1605) was a Spanish composer and chapel master, who has been recognised as one of the most outstanding polyphonists in the New World, and who was active in Granada, Antequera, Cusco, Santiago de Guatemala (present-day Antigua Guatemala), and Puebla.

== Life ==
Pedro Bermúdez was born 1558 in Granada, Spain. From an early age he was a choirboy in the cathedral of his home town, where he was taught by Santos de Aliseda. He later was a pupil of composition of Rodrigo de Ceballos (1530–81) at the Royal Chapel of Granada. In 1584, Bermúdez won the position of chapel master in Antequera, where he experienced continued strain and pressure from the church dignitaries, as he showed little inclination to teach the choirboys. After two years in that position he was dismissed following a fight with one of the choir singers. Returning to Granada, he became a singer in the Royal Chapel. In 1595 he was invited by Antonio de la Raya, newly appointed bishop of Cusco, Peru, to follow him to the New World and become the chapel master at the cathedral of that ancient Inca city, now under Spanish occupation. He commenced his activities in Cusco in September 1597. After only seven weeks, however, he took to the sea again, boarding a ship that sailed to Guatemala. In 1598 he was at the cathedral of Santiago de Guatemala, present-day Antigua Guatemala, where he composed most of his music. In 1603 he left Guatemala, invited by the chapter of the cathedral of Puebla, in New Spain, to become chapel master there. However, soon after his arrival his health declined, and he died towards the end of 1605 at the age of 47.

== Works ==
All of the works of Pedro Bermúdez are sacred compositions on Latin texts of the Roman Catholic liturgy, for 4 to 8 voice unaccompanied chorus. With only one exception, the entirety of his musical output is extant in Guatemala City. Two of his Masses have survived: the Misa de Bomba, a parody Mass based on Mateo Flecha's (c. 1481-c.1553) choral composition Ensalada "La bomba", and the Misa de feria, to be sung during penitential times. The Guatemalan choir books also preserve a collection of hymns for vespers and compline of different liturgical occasions, the psalm Miserere mei, 2 lamentations, and 3 passions for Holy Week.

The works of Pedro Bermúdez reveal an impressive and imaginative command of 16th century counterpoint. They also reflect the high quality of cathedral music in the New World, which was at the same level with liturgical music in Spanish and other European cathedrals.
