= Hernando Franco =

Spanish composer

Hernando Franco (1532 – November 28, 1585) was a Spanish composer of the Renaissance, who was mainly active in Guatemala and Mexico.

== Life ==
Franco was born in Galizuela (now part of Esparragosa de Lares, Badajoz Province) in Extremadura, a source region for many people who came to the New World in the 16th century. He was trained in music as a choir boy, and later apprentice and journeyman, at Segovia Cathedral by Gerónimo de Espinar, who may also have been a teacher of Tomás Luis de Victoria. While a youth he met and befriended Lázaro del Álamo, who was to precede him as maestro de capilla in Mexico City.

Most likely Franco went to Nueva España in the 1550s, though there is no record of his activities until 1571 when he appears in the records as maestro de capilla of the cathedral of Santiago de Guatemala, the capital city of the Captaincy General of Guatemala. That magnificent building, since destroyed by an earthquake, had been newly constructed in the valley of Panchoy, present-day Antigua Guatemala, after the city had to be moved from the previous site in the Almolonga valley.

Franco left that position in 1574 after a series of budget cuts that affected his salary, and undertook the journey to Mexico. Here he was fortunate to find the position of maestro de capilla of the new cathedral vacant. He was appointed the new chapel master in 1575, where his old friend Lázaro del Álamo had been maestro de capilla from 1556 to 1570.

Franco was clearly a well-respected and beloved figure, since he was granted a prebend in 1581 and contemporary documents contain numerous references to his exemplary character and musicianship. He resigned in 1582 during a period of financial difficulties in Mexico City, and died in 1585. He is buried in the cathedral's main chapel.

== Work and influence ==
Franco wrote 20 motets which survive, as well as 16 Magnificat settings and a setting for four voices of the Lamentations of Jeremiah. He seems to have written no masses, an unusual omission for a composer who headed a Spanish chapel choir, but it is possible that much of his music has been lost. Some hymns in the Nahuatl language by a composer of the same name (Hernando don Franco) are now presumed to be the work of a native composer who took Franco's name, as was the custom, on his conversion to Christianity and baptism (if so, they may be the earliest extant notated music in the European tradition by a Native American composer).

Franco's style is related to that of other Spanish composers of the period, though more conservative, treating dissonance carefully, avoiding chromaticism and virtuosity; indeed tending towards austerity. His settings of the Magnificat were influenced by those by Cristóbal de Morales. The voice range of his works is limited, and may reflect the singing abilities of his choirs, which were not up to the musical standards of those in Europe.

Franco is the earliest known composer in Guatemala; his two pieces in the archives of the Guatemala cathedral, a Lumen ad revelationem and a Benedicamus Domino, are the earliest surviving manuscripts from the area. Other composers preceded him in Mexico, but he was considered by his contemporaries to be the finest of the 16th century there.

== References and further reading ==
- "Franco, Hernando", "Guatemala", in The New Grove Dictionary of Music and Musicians, ed. Stanley Sadie. 20 vol. London, Macmillan Publishers Ltd., 1980. ISBN 1-56159-174-2
- Barwick, Steven. The Franco Codex of the Cathedral of Mexico City. Carbondale, Illinois: Southern Illinois University Press, 1965.
- Barwick, Steven. Two Mexico City Choirbooks of 1717. Carbondale, Illinois: Southern Illinois University Press, 1982. ISBN 0-8093-1065-1
- Lehnhoff, Dieter. Creación musical en Guatemala. Guatemala City: Editorial Galería Guatemala, 2005, 42–3. ISBN 99922-704-7-0
- Reese, Gustave. Music in the Renaissance. New York: W.W. Norton & Co., 1954. ISBN 0-393-09530-4
- Snow, Robert L. A New World Collection of Polyphony. Chicago, Illinois: University of Chicago Press, 1996. ISBN 0-226-76744-2
- Tello, Aurelio. "Franco, Hernando". Diccionario de la Música Española e Hispanoamericana, 10 vols., ed. Emilio Casares Rodicio. Madrid: Sociedad General de Autores y Editores, 1999, 5/247-8. ISBN 84-8048-303-2
