= Music history of Portugal =

Portugal has a long music history, beginning around the year 600 C.E, which accompanied and strongly contributed to the development of the music history in Europe.

== Medieval music ==
=== Liturgical repertoire ===
In the early days of the Catholic Church, several local liturgies developed, such as the Gallican in France, the Sarum in England, the antique Roman in Rome and the Ambrosian rite in Milan. The Visigothic Council of Toledo organized the Hispanic rite (Visigothic or Mozarab are variant terms) in 633.

The main source of the Hispanic rite is the León Antifonary (tenth century), which was most probably copied from an original collected in Beja (now in Alentejo, southern Portugal). The Beja region is home to one of the earliest mentions of a musician. In the activity of Andre Princeps Cantorum (489–525). The oldest manuscript (eleventh century) of Portuguese liturgical music in Toledan Hispanic notation is kept at the University of Coimbra General Library. Most other existing documents use Aquitan notation. From the middle of the thirteenth century on, the notation presents typically Portuguese variations; this Portuguese notation was used until the fifteenth century, when modern notation in staves was adopted.

However, the church started to worry about the proliferation of liturgies. From the mixture of the Galician liturgy with the antique Roman one would result, traditionally under pope Gregory I (540–604), the modern Roman liturgy, also known as Gregorian liturgy, comprising the Gregorian chant. This would become the official liturgy of the Catholic Church and gradually substituted for the local ones. In the Iberian Peninsula, the Council of Burgos decreed the substitution of the Hispanic rite by the modern Roman one in 1080. This measure was eased by the fact that, during the Reconquista, most of the bishops were French (Gérard, Maurice Bourdin, Jean Péculier, Bernard, Hughes).

=== Profane music ===
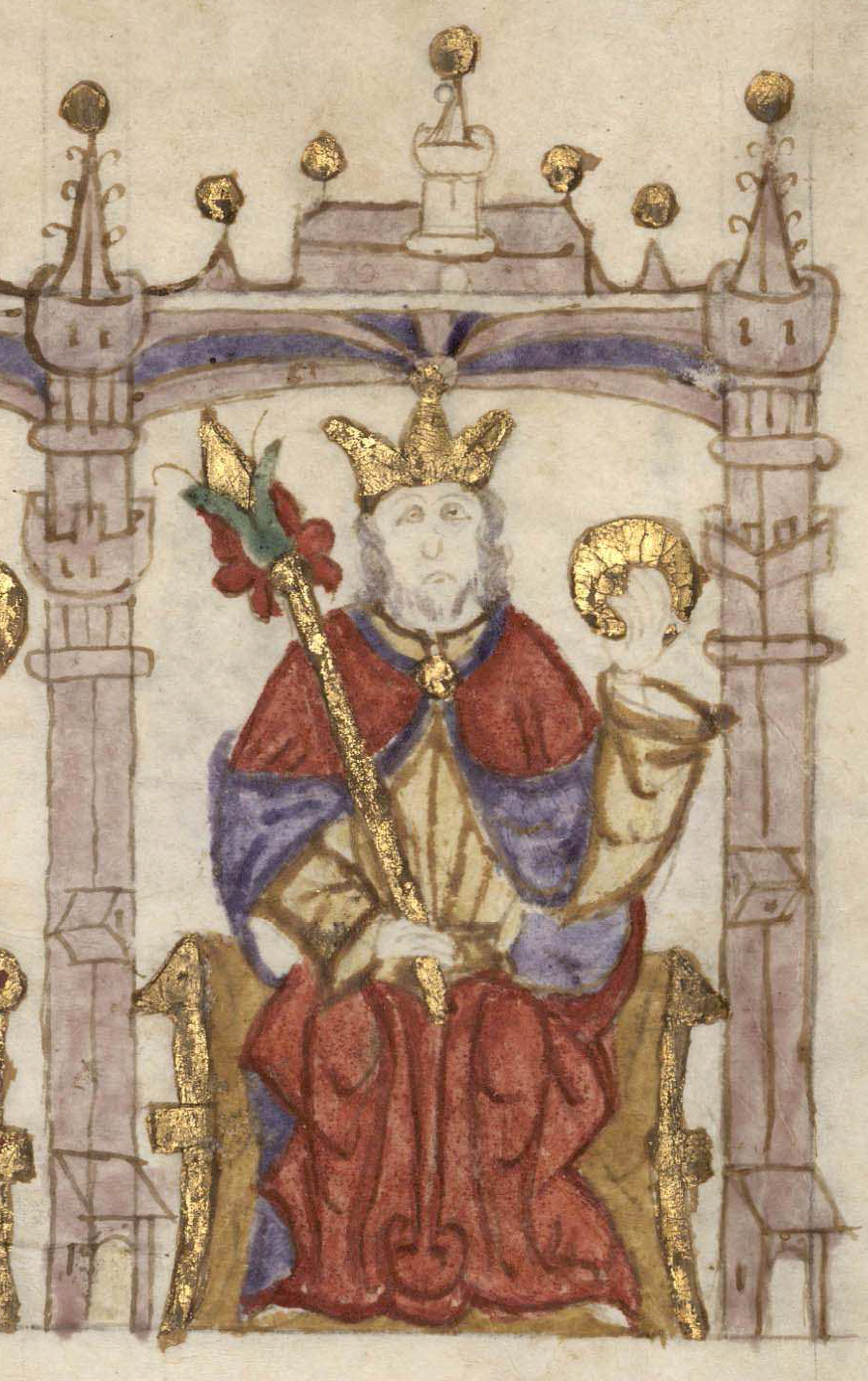
King Dinis I of Portugal, from the Semblanzas de reyes.

In Portugal, an aristocratic poetical-musical genre was cultivated, at least since the independence (1139), whose texts are kept in three main collections (Cancioneiros): Cancioneiro da Ajuda (13th century), Cancioneiro da Biblioteca Nacional (16th, on originals from the 14th), Cancioneiro da Vaticana (16th, on originals from the 14th). The 1680 poems kept in the Cancioneiros are divided in three forms: cantigas de amigo (songs of friend), cantigas de amor (songs of love) and cantigas de escárnio e maldizer (songs of mockery). The link to music is well evidenced in the Cancioneiro da Ajuda, where the staves have been drawn, but no melodies have been written.

The only musical source known until recently was due to a bookseller in Madrid, who found a parchment with the seven Cantigas de Amigo by Martin Codax, six of them with the respective melodies, in the beginning of the 20th century. Codax was a Galician troubadour from the court of King Dinis I of Portugal. In 1990, Prof. Harvey L. Sharrer (University of California at Santa Barbara) discovered at the Torre do Tombo in Lisbon, a medieval document (the Pergaminho Sharrer) with seven Cantigas de Amor by King Dom Dinis, including its musical setting.

== Development of polyphony ==
Little is known about the introduction of polyphony in Portugal. Polyphony was used in nearby places, such as Santiago de Compostela in Galicia (Spain), and it was imported to Portugal in the well-developed stage. Jehan Simon de Haspre was a well-known composer and defender of the ars subtilior and helped popularize polyphony while in the court of Fernando I of Portugal.

The main centers for Portuguese musical development during this period was the royal chapel, the monasteries (Santa Cruz Monastery in Coimbra and the Alcobaça Monastery), royal court, cathedrals (specially the Cathedral of Évora) and the university.

=== The royal chapel ===
The Capela Real, royal chapel, was founded by D. Dinis in 1299. D. Duarte (1391–1438) elaborated a Regiment (Ordenaçam) of the Chapel, which indicates that the standard practice was a three-voice singing. His son, Afonso V (1432–1481), sent the Mestre de Capela (Master of the Chapel), Álvaro Afonso, to the court of Henry VI of England (1421–1471) in order to get a copy of the statutes, regiment and liturgy practiced in the English Royal Chapel. The detailed description written by William Say is still kept at Évora.

=== The court ===
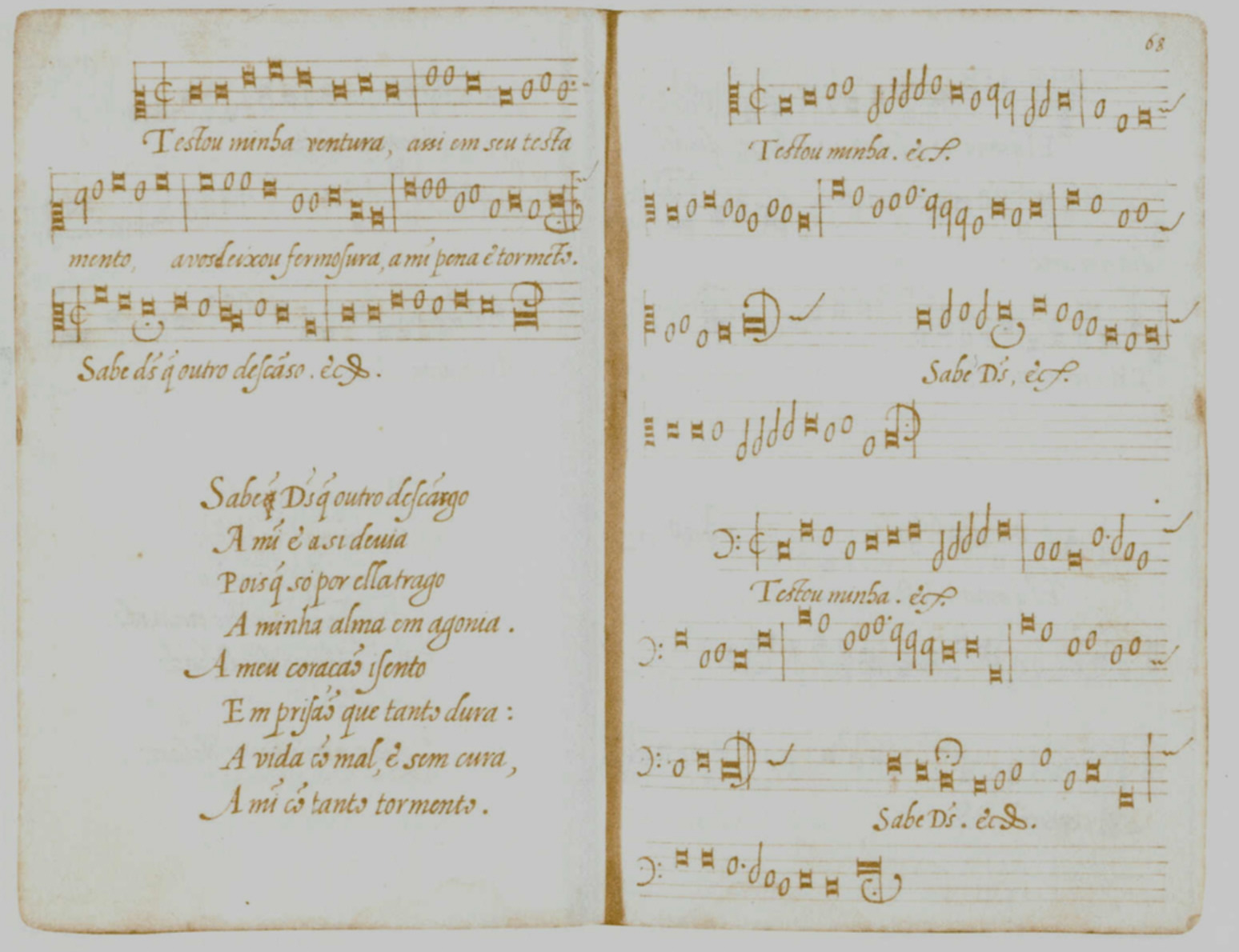
Testou minha ventura, one of the 65 anonymous works compiled in the Cancioneiro de Elvas.

As with the trovadoresque poetry, we keep important collections of texts of the 15th and 16th century (e.g. Cancioneiro Geral, compiled by Garcia de Resende), but the musical documents are fewer. The main sources of the court music in the Renaissance and Mannerist periods are: Cancioneiro de Elvas (Públia Hortênsia Library, at Elvas), Cancioneiro de Lisboa (National Library, Lisbon), Cancioneiro de Paris (École nationale supérieure des Beaux-Arts, Paris), Cancioneiro de Belém (Museu Nacional de Arqueologia e Etnologia, Lisbon)

The poetical forms are the vilancete (or villancico), the cantiga and the romance. The first two, similar to the French virelai and to the Italian ballata, are generally dedicated to the love thematic, though satire and social criticism are not excluded. They share a refrain and stanzas structure. The romance is dedicated to celebrate historical events, applying the same musical text to all the stanzas of the poem.

=== The cathedrals ===
Cardinal-Princes D. Afonso (1509–1540) and D. Henrique (1512–1580), sons of D. Manuel I of Portugal (1469–1521) administrated the main Portuguese dioceses through the 16th century. Afonso administrated the Évora and Lisboa dioceses until his death. Henrique was successively Archbishop of Braga, Lisboa and Évora, as well as head of the Portuguese Inquisition. He became King of Portugal when his grand-nephew Sebastião I (1554–1578) died at Alcácer-Quibir (1578). As princes, they had their personal chapels and imposed a magnificent liturgy in the cathedrals they administrated.

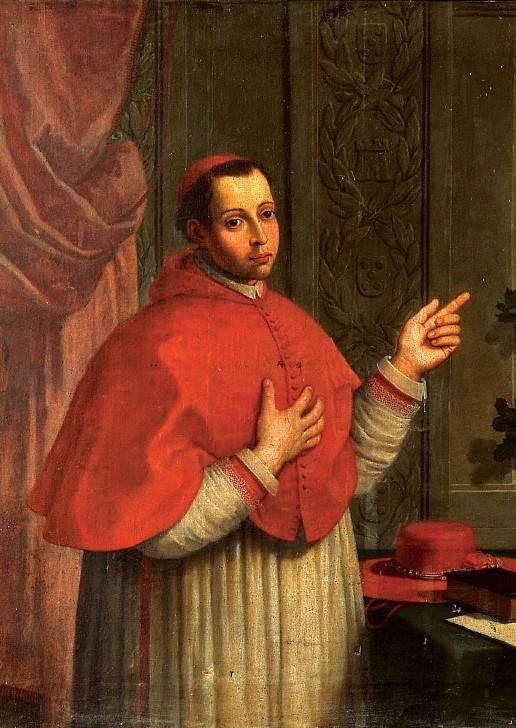
Cardinal-Infante Afonso of Portugal

In Évora, D. Afonso attracted high-quality musicians (like Mateus de Aranda, Mestre de Capela from 1528 to 1544) for the cathedral by establishing significant wages; Pedro do Porto (also known as Pedro Escobar, El Portugués), Cantor of the chapel of Isabel I of Castile, the Catholic Queen, and Master of the choir boys at Sevilla, comes as Mestre de Capela to Évora. He is the author of the most ancient polyphonic piece by a Portuguese author (a three-voice Magnificat), as well as the most ancient polyphonic treatment of the Requiem in the Iberian Peninsula. D. Afonso also founded a school for the choir boys, allowing them to study after the voice-change; many of these boys became professional musicians. This Évora school formed high-standard musicians for more than 150 years. Besides Évora, Braga and Coimbra show a particular care in the liturgy. The most ancient version from a Mass by a Portuguese author is from a Cantor of the Coimbra cathedral, Fernão Gomes Correia (active 1505–32).

=== The main monasteries ===
The Santa Cruz Monastery

The most important monasteries kept a solemn liturgy. From these, the Santa Cruz Monastery, in Coimbra, had a particular importance. Founded in the 12th century by D. Afonso Henriques, it was the first school of superior studies in Portugal (St. Anthony of Padua – or of Lisbon – studied there). In the 16th century, several monks distinguished by their musical gifts, as D. Heliodoro de Paiva and D. Francisco de Santa Maria. The musical performances at Santa Cruz competed with those at El Escorial, and were praised for their conciliation between polyphony and the respect for the sacred texts.

=== The university ===
The Portuguese University was founded in Lisbon by D. Dinis in 1290 and had a Music teacher as early as 1323. After several transfers between Coimbra and Lisbon, King João III (1502–1557) established it definitively at Coimbra in 1537. The move to Coimbra was followed by a reorganization in 1544, in which the King himself proposed Mateus de Aranda (Mestre de Capela at Évora after Pedro do Porto) as music teacher. The music teacher was also Mestre de Capela of the University.

== The Mannerist Period (2nd half 16th and 17th centuries) ==
=== Historical context ===
By the end of the 16th century, circumstances led to the disappearance of profane music in Portugal and religious music taking over. There are economical and political factors, like the troubles to keep the Portuguese conquests in Morocco and the competition led by Venetians and Turks (later by Dutch and English) to the spice trade, which leads to the closing of the Portuguese feitoria (which was a kind of "spice supermarket") in Antwerp. In cultural terms, the influence of the Counter-Reformation in Portugal is enormous: i) João III introduces the Inquisition in Portugal in 1536; his brother Henrique will be the first General Inquisitor; ii) the Jesuits come to Portugal in 1540 and soon start teaching in their own colleges in Coimbra and Lisbon. In 1555, they are in charge of the Arts College in Coimbra (the superior school in Portugal with most prestige), after the expulsion by the Inquisition of its most reputed teachers (like André de Gouveia); iii) the Portuguese church participated actively in the Council of Trent and, in 1564, Portugal becomes the only Catholic country where the council decisions (namely those concerning the musical practice in the church) are integrally published as laws.

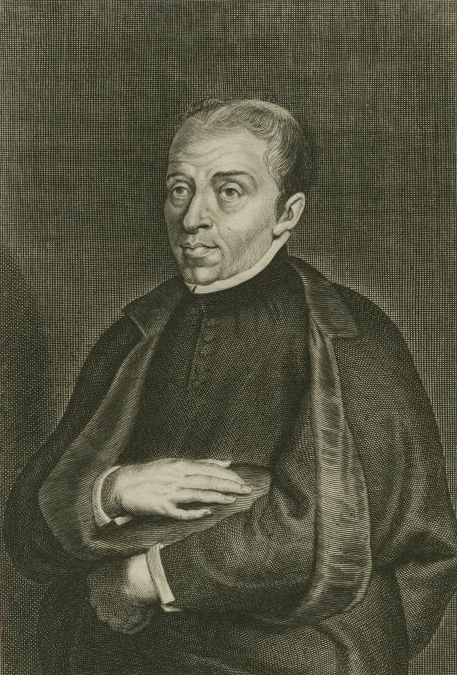
Duarte Lobo

In this context, the profane music declined in the courts of João III and his grandson Sebastião I. In 1578, with the death of Sebastião I, Cardinal Henrique becomes king of Portugal. After his death in 1580, Portugal loses its independence, as the throne is inherited by Felipe II, king of Spain (1527–1598). With the disappearance of the court in Lisbon, the aristocracy retired to their homes in the countryside, and the profane music nearly vanishes. The development of the Portuguese music in the end of 16th is thus mainly in the sacred polyphony.

=== Climax of the Évora school ===
In 1575, Cardinal Henrique brought Manuel Mendes (1547 - 1605), Mestre de Capela at Portalegre, to Évora, where he took the Mestre de Claustra position. Besides his qualities as a composer, Manuel Mendes is remarkable as a teacher. He formed the most part of the extremely competent professional musicians who would have the most reputed musical positions in Portugal in the next decades. Between his students at Évora, we have the most noted polyphonists of the next generation: Fr. Manuel Cardoso (1566–1650), Filipe de Magalhães ( – 1652) and Duarte Lobo (1564/69-1646) [6]. These continued the pedagogical action of their teacher, worthing him references as «mestre de toda boa musica deste reino» («teacher of every good music in this kingdom») and «el Mendes Sonoroso que de Musicos llena toda a Europa» («the sound Mendes who replenishes Europe with musicians»).

=== Other centres of musical activity in the 17th century ===
==== Santa Cruz at Coimbra ====
Prominent composers of the 17th century include Pedro de Cristo, D. Pedro da Esperança and D. Gabriel de S. João. The manuscripts kept at the General Library of the University of Coimbra reveal innovative polyphonic practices, such as polychorality, accompanied monody and instrument obligato.

==== The Royal Chapel ====
In spite of the absence of the King, it remains an important centre, with Mestres de Capela such as Francisco Garro, Filipe de Magalhães and Marcos Soares Pereira.

==== Chapel of the Dukes of Bragança at Vila Viçosa ====
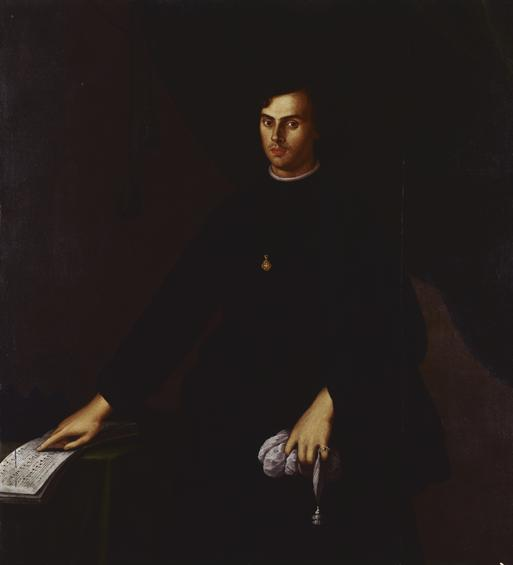
João Lourenço Rebelo, pictured by José de Avelar Rebelo, c. 1646.

During the Spanish domination, the duke of Bragança retired to his palace in Vila Viçosa. The ducal chapel maintained a magnificent liturgy and, in 1609, Teodósio II founded the Santos Reis Magos College, working in a similar way to the Évora school. Roberto Tornar, mestre de Capela at Vila Viçosa, would become the musical instructor of the young Duke of Barcelos, D. João (later D. João IV, king of Portugal). This king, both before and after succeeding to the Portuguese throne, enlarged immensely the musical library of his father, transforming it in the biggest musical library of the time in Europe. Further, João IV was a composer and a theorist himself, as well as a devoted patron of João Lourenço Rebelo (1610–1661), whose works he would send for printing at Rome. Robelo, some of whose pieces have been issued on CD, composed in an innovative style, making use of opulent polychoral writing à la Giovanni Gabrieli and combining it with the more conservative idiom of Palestrina.

=== Instrumental music ===
It was in the domain of organ music, the organ being itself the liturgical instrument par excellence, that Portugal's composers of the 16th and 17th centuries achieved particularly high standards. Portuguese organs, as well as Spanish ones, usually had just one manual, without pedalboard. (Or, if a pedalboard was included, it was very basic, and it forbade any melodic complexity of the sort that German composers of organ music from the early 16th century, such as Arnolt Schlick, took for granted in their own pedal parts.) Nevertheless, the surviving music conceived for these organs does often show considerable contrapuntal ingenuity as far as the writing for keyboard is concerned.

Several organ mechanisms were cultivated more in the Iberian peninsula than anywhere else. For example, these organs frequently incorporated a device known as meio-registo ("half-stop"), which, when activated, divided the keyboard into two distinct parts with sharp contrasts in timbre, giving the effect of two manuals instead of one. Another conspicuous feature in both Portugal and Spain was the horizontal placing (em chamada, the Portuguese called it) of particularly powerful, strident reed stops, very useful for imitating trumpet fanfares.

In the 16th century António Carreira was the chief Portuguese organist-composer (his significance to Portugal resembles that of his slightly older contemporary Antonio de Cabezón to Spain). But Carreira's output was never published during his lifetime. The first printed volume of Portuguese instrumental music did not appear until 1620: Flores de Música para o instrumento de tecla e harpa ("Music flowers for the keyboard instrument and harp"), by Manuel Rodrigues Coelho, who died in around 1635. This contains only sacred compositions. Coelho worked as an organist in the cathedrals of Badajoz, Elvas and Lisbon.

During the 17th century a notable school of organists developed in Braga. The main figures in this connection were Gaspar dos Reis, employed at Braga Cathedral; Pedro de Araújo; and a priest-composer, Diogo da Conceição.

Two prominent genres of early Portuguese organ music were the Tento de Meio-Registo (Half-Stop Tento) and the Batalha (Battle). This last form goes back to one of the most famous pieces by Clément Janequin: La bataille de Marignan ou La Guerre, in which the characteristic sounds of a battle are imitated. The Iberian composers would often quote whole phrases from Janequin's original, adding to these phrases distinctive keyboard figuration.

== The Baroque period and the Italian influence ==
=== João V, the Magnanimous ===
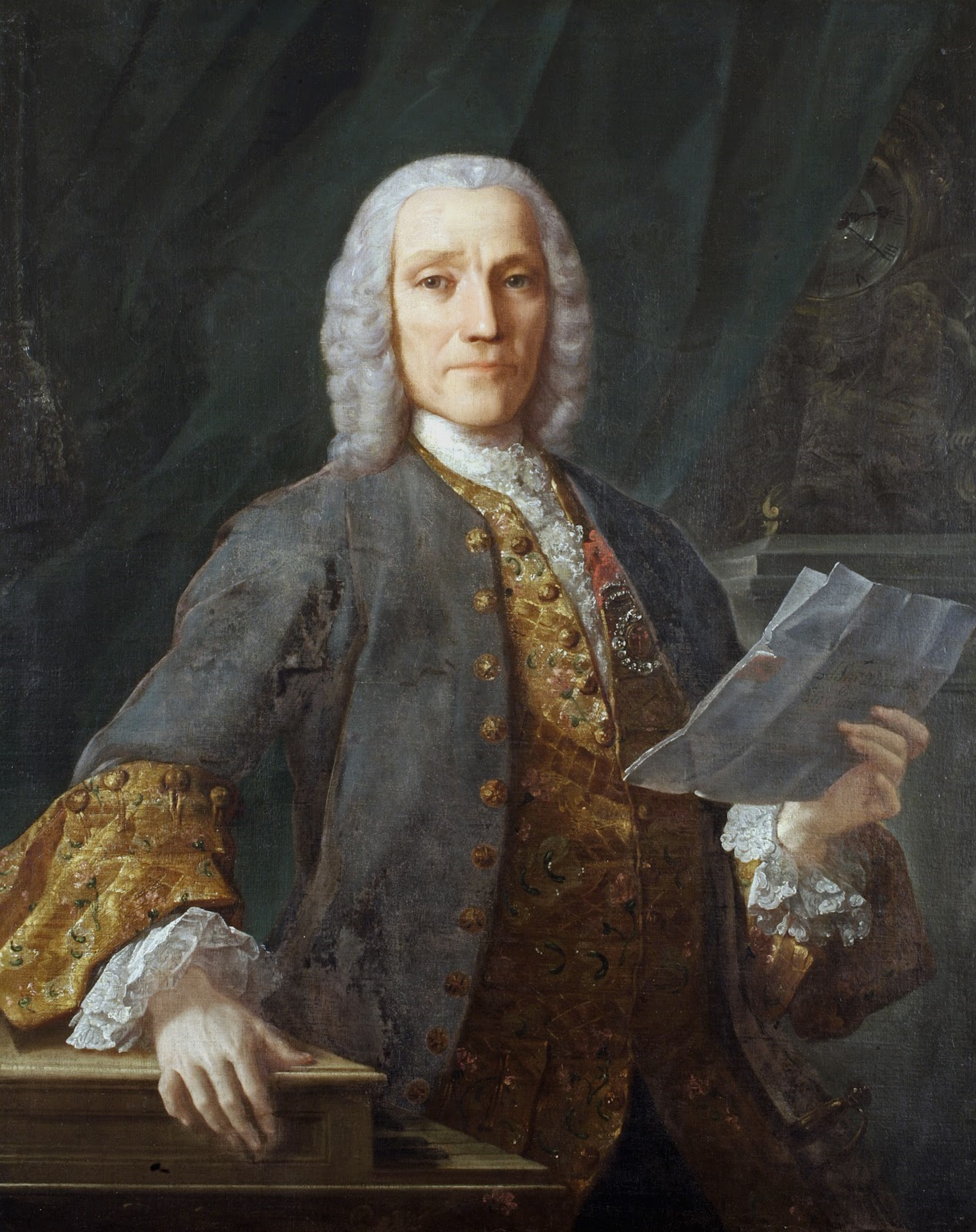
Domenico Scarlatti, in a 1738 portrait by Domingo Antonio Velasco

Around the end of the 17th century, Portuguese composers gradually evolved towards the new musical language that would result in the modern tonalism. The government of João V (1706–50) marked a transition in the Portuguese society and culture. After the definitive peace with Spain, the monarch tried to modernize the Portuguese economy and to drive the country to a development scheme similar to the French Absolutism of Louis XIV. The main originality on D. João V's absolutism is that he managed, using his influence with the Pope, to face the huge political, economical and cultural power of the Church, by reorganizing it in order to strength its unity and discipline and then putting it under the royal authority. In a very clever process, João V got for his chapel the dignity of Patriarchal Basilica, by dividing the Lisbon archdioceses. The chaplain became a Cardinal. Then he got the reunification of the dioceses under the command of the royal chaplain. So, the Cardinal-Patriarch, Archbishop of Lisbon, was merely the chaplain of the King of Portugal... João V took a special care with the liturgy in his chapel, which he wanted as monumental as the Papal chapel in Rome. He got it repeating somehow the formula of Cardinal D. Afonso two hundred years before: contracting high-standard professional musicians and creating structures for the adequate formation of Portuguese musicians. As such, he contracted the brilliant Master of the Capella Giulia, in Rome, Domenico Scarlatti, as Mestre da Capela Real and music teacher of princess D. Maria Magdalena Bárbara and founded in 1713 a specialized school annex to the Patriarchal Basilica: the Patriarchal Seminary, which would become the major music school in Portugal and form generations of professional musicians of remarkable quality until the foundation of the National Conservatory in 1835. The most gifted students of the Patriarcal Seminary were sent to Rome at the King's expenses. Those were the cases, namely, of António Teixeira, João Rodrigues Esteves and Francisco António de Almeida, who were hence formed in the Roman ecclesiastic baroque school and had the chance of getting acquainted with the Roman operatic tradition.

=== Opera and its beginnings ===
The first performance of Il Don Chisciotte della Mancia, with music by Scarlatti took place in 1728 in the Ribeira Palace at Lisbon. This was the first operatic-style performance in Portugal and was followed by other opera buffa performances in the Royal Palace in the years to come. However, they had little impact in the music life, not only because the public had extremely limited access, but also because the King did not pay much attention to them. It was in the Trindade Theatre, in 1735, that the Alessandro Paghetti company had permission to perform the first opera seria for a wider (aristocratic) audience. The success was enormous, and the company kept performing until 1742, now in the Teatro da Rua dos Condes. At the same time, a set of performances in Portuguese by António José da Silva's (o Judeu) plays had begun (1733) in the Bairro Alto Theatre, with music by António Teixeira. The audience of these plays grew even wider. However, D. João V became ill in 1742, and the mysticism that surrounded him in his last years resulted in a prohibition against all theatrical performances until his death.

=== Instrumental music ===
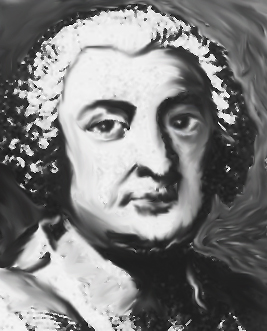
Carlos Seixas

Undoubtedly, the most important Portuguese keyboard composer of the time is José António Carlos Seixas (1704–1742). Son of Francisco Vaz, organist of the Coimbra Cathedral, Carlos Seixas goes, with only sixteen years of age, but already very famous, to Lisbon, where he is appointed as organist of the Patriarchal Cathedral. There, he would soon be appointed as Vice-Mestre de Capela (the Mestre de Capela was Scarlatti himself and Seixas was, at the time, the only Portuguese member of the Royal Chapel). Seixas has left us 105 two-part baroque Sonatas (or Tocatas) for keyboard. He also wrote religious and orchestral music. However, his most original contribution is a Concert for harpsichord and strings, one of the first examples of this form in Europe.

=== Opera and Sacred music under D. José I and D. Maria I ===
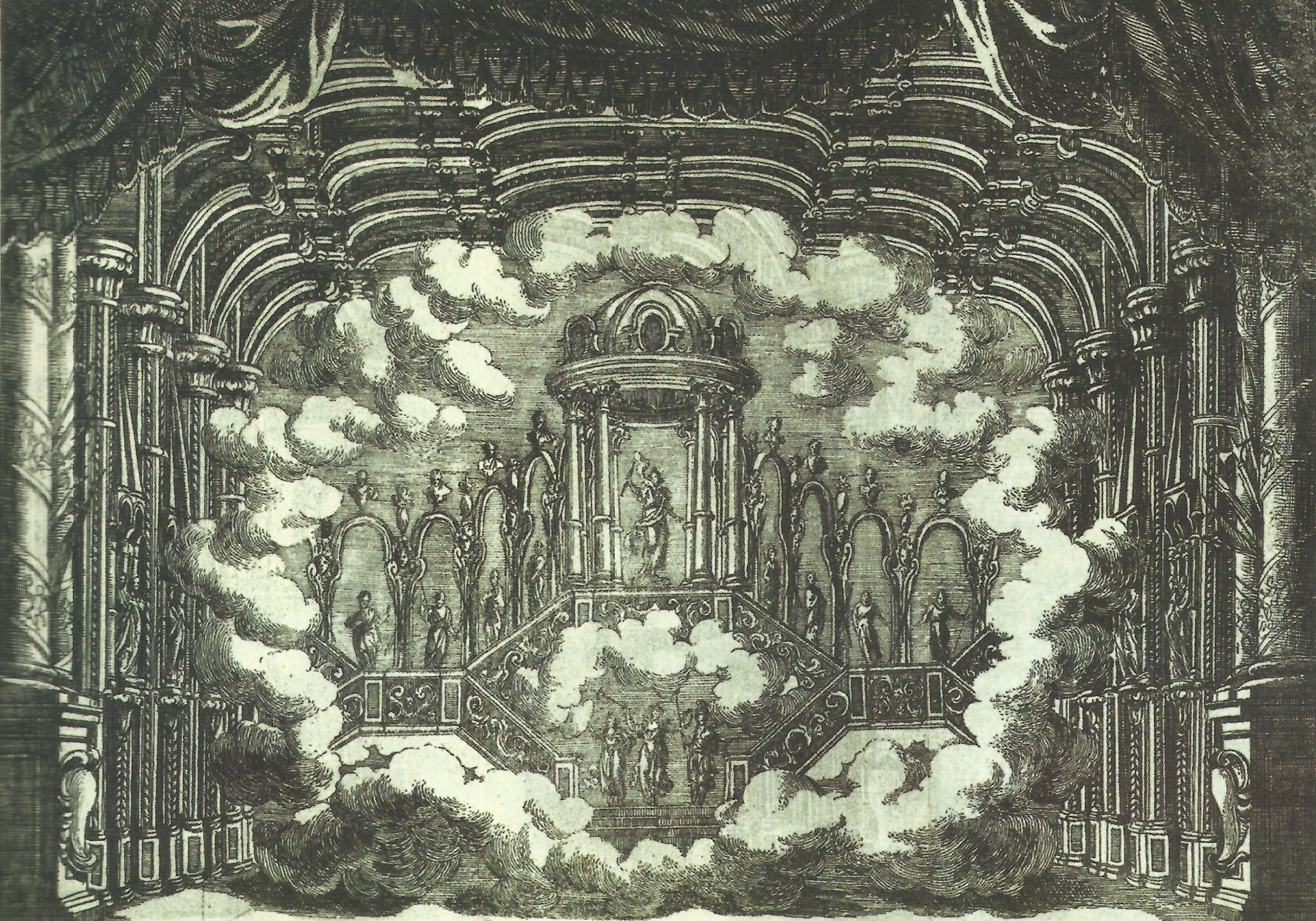
Depiction of the stage of the Ópera do Tejo on opening night, 31 March 1755.

With D. José I (1714–1777), the operatic activity is taken again. The neapolitan David Perez (1711–1778), one of the most reputed Italian opera composers, is hired in 1752. The climax of Perez activity would be the inauguration of the monumental Ópera do Tejo, in March 1755, with the opera Alessandro nell'Indie. But the Lisbon earthquake of 1 November 1755 destroyed the new building, together with Lisbon downtown. The royal palace also disappeared, and with it the musical Library of D. João IV. After the earthquake, the public theatres like the Rua dos Condes Theatre and the Bairro Alto Theatre are rebuilt (but not the Ópera do Tejo). Already under D. Maria I, would be built the S. Carlos Theatre (now Teatro Nacional de S. Carlos), in Lisbon (1792) and the S. João Theatre in Oporto (1798). The neapolitan influence is enormous and, under D. José and D. Maria, the gifted music students of the Patriarchal are sent to Santo Onofre Conservatory in Naples. Afterwards, these students distinguished in the Neapolitan operatic style, as well as in the sacred music. Between these we have João de Sousa Carvalho (1745–1798), a Vila Viçosa school student and perhaps the most prominent composer of the 2nd half of the 18th century. Besides his operatic and sacred music production, he may also be considered the most remarkable keyboard composer of the time. Other relevant Portuguese composers of the time are Jerónimo Francisco de Lima, Luciano Xavier dos Santos, José Joaquim dos Santos, José dos Santos Maurício, António Leal Moreira and, particularly, Marcos Portugal, perhaps the Portuguese composer with the most international career ever.

== The 19th century ==
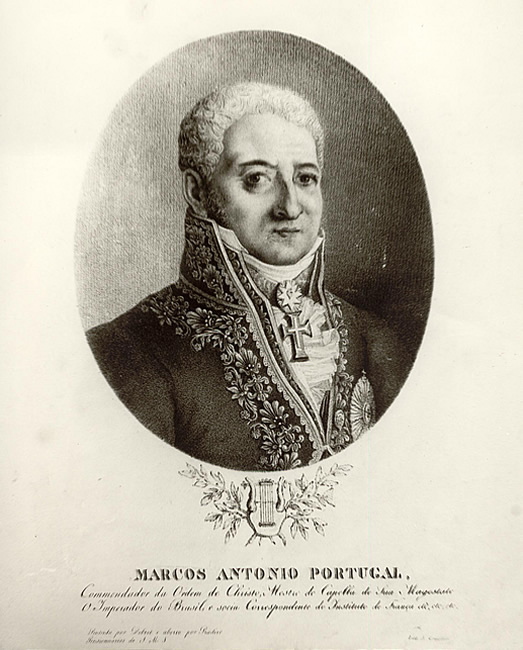
Marcos Portugal, the most internationally acclaimed Portuguese composer.

With the Napoleonic invasions, the Royal family goes to Brazil and the court establishes in the Rio de Janeiro. This presence would conduce to the independence of this colony (1822) and would be benefic as well to the development of Brazilian music (the first well-known Brazilian composer is José Maurício Nunes Garcia, member of the royal chapel at the Rio de Janeiro). Meanwhile, the constitutional régime is proclaimed (1820) and King D. João VI (1767–1826) is forced to come back. The activity of the Royal Chamber Orchestra (founded by D. João V), which had been in the previous century one of the most important chamber orchestras in Europe, declines irreversibly. However, in the turn of the 19th century, generalizes the tradition of amateur academies performing the contemporary instrumental music. The generalization of public concerts is due to João Domingos Bomtempo (1775–1842), the most prominent musical figure of the first half of the 19th century. Bomtempo, son of an Italian musician of the court Orchestra, studied with the Patriarchal masters. Unlike most of his contemporaries, he was not interested in opera and, in 1801, instead of going to Italy, he travels to Paris, starting a virtuoso pianist career. He moves to London in 1810 and gets acquainted with the liberal circles. In 1822 he is back to Lisbon, and founds a Philharmonic Society to promote public concerts of the contemporary music. After the civil war between liberals and absolutists, Bomtempo becomes music teacher of Queen D. Maria II (1819–1853) and first Director of the National Conservatory, created in 1835 and which replaced the old Patriarchal Seminary, extinct by the liberal régime. As a composer, Bomtempo produced a vast amount of concerti, sonatas, variations and fantasias for the piano. His two known symphonies are the first to be produced by a Portuguese composer. The master piece of Bomtempo is his Requiem to the memory of Luís de Camões.

== The 20th century ==
=== The turn of the 20th century ===
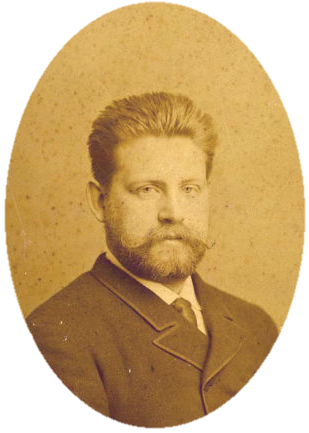
Alfredo Keil, who composed patriotic march A Portuguesa, later used as the country's national anthem; and A Serrana, the first modern opera with a Portuguese libretto.

Throughout the 19th century, there is a proliferation of concert societies. Bernardo Moreira de Sá (1853–1924), in Oporto, is the director, among others, of the Quartet Society and forms the Moreira de Sá Quartet, which will have an international career. He will have a decisive influence in the Formation of the Oporto Conservatory (1917). However, opera remained as the favourite activity of Portuguese composers, though the creative activity moved slowly towards the symphonic and chamber music fields. The two most significant lyric composers are Alfredo Keil (1850–1907) and Augusto Machado (1845–1924). José Vianna da Motta (1868–1948) and Luís de Freitas Branco (1890–1955) have a special place in the Portuguese musical life in the turn of the 20th century.

==== Vianna da Motta ====
Vianna da Motta went to Scharwenka Conservatory in Berlin in 1882 at expenses of King Fernando II of Portugal. He also attended Liszt's classes at Weimar in 1885, as well as Hans von Bülow's. In Germany, he started a career as a concertist and exceptional interpret of Bach, Beethoven and Liszt. During the First World War, he taught at Geneva Conservatory. In 1917, he came back to Portugal, becoming director of the National Conservatory. As a composer, he is very close to the German Romanticism, and dedicates himself to the production of a national style, by including and recreating the national folklore. His most emblematic work is the A Major Symphony "À Pátria" (1895).

==== Luís de Freitas Branco ====
Luís de Freitas Branco (1890–1955) is usually appointed as the «introducer of modernism in Portugal», by his decisive role in the approximation of Portuguese music to the most innovative European aesthetics, namely the Schönberg atonalism and the French impressionism. Pupil of Augusto Machado and Tomás Borba, he studied with the Belgian organist and composer Désiré Pâque and, in 1910, went to Berlin to study with Humperdinck. There, he attended to a performance of Debussy's Pélleas et Mélisande, which was determinant in his aesthetic orientation. In his early work we count the symphonic poems "Váthek" and "Paraísos Artificiais" and several piano pieces. His prolific production includes five symphonies, a violin concert and numerous vocal works.

==== Other composers ====
In the turn of the 20th century, other relevant composers are Francisco de Lacerda (1869–1934), Óscar da Silva (1870–1958), Luiz Costa (1879–1960) and António Fragoso (1897–1918). Lacerda was as well a famous director specialist in the French and Russian repertoire. He became assistant of Vincent d'Indy at the Schola Cantorum in Paris. His musical language is very close to that of Fauré and Debussy.

==== The Estado Novo régime ====
The military coup of 1926 installed in Portugal a dictatorship (self-called Estado Novo, "the new state") which would condition the Portuguese life for near half century. The concept of culture is substituted, in the mainstream of European fascisms, by the concept of propaganda. This propaganda had its maximum height at the Nationality Centenary in 1940; the S. Carlos Theatre was then reopened after a restoration with an opera by the regime semi-official composer Ruy Coelho. Curiously, the most important figure of Portuguese musical life in that period is a composer who openly contested the régime and its aesthetic orientations and who, consequently, was forced to do his entire activity outside the institutional circuits: Fernando Lopes Graça.

==== Lopes Graça ====
Fernando Lopes Graça (1906–1995) was student of Tomás Borba, Luiz de Freitas Branco and Vianna da Motta at the National Conservatory and finished the Superior Course on Composition in 1931. He tried to get a position at that institution, but was arrested by political reasons and the place was not conceded to him. He taught for some time in the Music Academy in Coimbra and, in 1937, went to Paris at his expenses, where he studied musicology. There he composed the first works of his musical maturity (2nd Piano Sonata, Quartet for Violin, Viola, Cello and Piano). After coming back to Portugal in 1939, Lopes Graça taught at the Academia de Amadores de Música at Lisbon. Of his production, it worth mentioning the numerous harmonizations or adaptations of popular Portuguese songs for choir or soloist, the songs for voice and piano over the poems of the most important Portuguese poets, the numerous political songs, as well as the symphonic music, chamber music and piano music production. Lopes Graça undertook, with the Corsican ethnologist Michael Giacometti, a systematic study of Portuguese folk music, which he assimilated and used thoroughly in his musical speech. His view from the folklore is far from the regime bucolic or picturesque view, rather strengthening the hard dimensions of rural life. The contemporaries of Lopes Graça generally choose a more pacific conservative "neo-classic" style: these were the cases of Armando José Fernandes (1906–1983), Jorge Croner de Vasconcelos (1910–1974), Frederico de Freitas (1902–1980), Joly Braga Santos (1924–1988) and Cláudio Carneyro (1895–1963).

== Contemporary trends ==
The coup on 25 April 1974 restored democracy in Portugal. The country knew a great development since then, particularly after the adhesion to the European Economic Community (now European Union) in 1986. The intellectual and cultural life had particular improvements. Music has also benefited from the increasing number of Conservatories and specialized superior schools, in a freedom context, as well as from the generalization of music festivals. The role of Foundation Calouste Gulbenkian (founded in 1953) has been of outstanding importance in every aspect of the cultural life, particularly the musical one.
