= Chansonnier =

Type of medieval songbook

A chansonnier (from French; Catalan: cançoner; Occitan: cançonièr; Galician and Portuguese: cancioneiro; Italian: canzoniere or Italian: canzoniero; Spanish: cancionero) is a manuscript or printed book which contains a collection of chansons, or polyphonic and monophonic settings of songs, hence literally "song-books"; however, some manuscripts are called chansonniers even though they preserve the text but not the music, for example, the Cancioneiro da Vaticana and Cancioneiro da Biblioteca Nacional, which contain the bulk of Galician-Portuguese lyrics.

The most important chansonniers contain lyrics, poems and songs of the troubadours and trouvères used in the medieval music. Prior to 1420, many song-books contained both sacred and secular music, one exception being those containing the work of Guillaume de Machaut. Around 1420, sacred and secular music was segregated into separate sources, with large choirbooks containing sacred music, and smaller chansonniers for more private use by the privileged. Chansonniers were compiled primarily in France, but also in Italy, Germany and in the Iberian Peninsula.

== List of chansonniers ==
=== Catalan ===
Siglum	Library	City	Shelf mark	Nickname	Date	Provenance	Digitised scan (external links)
A	Biblioteca de Catalunya	Barcelona, Spain	ms 146	Cançoner Gil			Biblioteca Digital de Catalunya
C	Biblioteca Nacional de España	Madrid, Spain	Res. I-27 / Res. 48	Cançoner dels Comtes d'Urgell			Biblioteca Digital Hispánica
D^{1}	Biblioteca Apostolica Vaticana	Vatican City	Ottob. Lat. 845				DigiVatLib
D^{2}	Biblioteca Apostolica Vaticana	Vatican City	Ottob. Lat. 542				DigiVatLib
D^{3}	Biblioteca de Catalunya	Barcelona, Spain	ms 2017				Biblioteca Digital de Catalunya
D^{4}	Biblioteca del Collegio di San Isidoro	Rome, Italy	ms 1/71				
D^{5}	Societat Arqueològica Lul·liana	Palma de Mallorca, Spain					
D^{6}	Biblioteca Apostolica Vaticana	Vatican City	Lat. 10036				
D^{7}	Biblioteca Nacional de España	Madrid, Spain	ms II-171				
E	Societat Arqueològica Lul·liana	Palma de Mallorca, Spain	MS 4	Cançoner d'Estanislau Aguiló			
F^{a}	Bibliothèque Nationale de France	Paris, France	ms esp. 487	Cançoner de Paris-Carpentràs			
F^{b}	Bibliothèque Municipale	Carpentras, France	ms 381	Cançoner de Paris-Carpentràs			
G	Biblioteca de Catalunya	Barcelona, Spain	1744	Cançoner Carreras			Biblioteca Digital de Catalunya
H^{a–b}	Biblioteca de Catalunya	Barcelona, Spain	mss 7–8	Cançoner Vega-Aguiló			Biblioteca Digital de Catalunya Biblioteca Digital de Catalunya (ultraviolet)
H^{k}	Biblioteca de Catalunya	Barcelona, Spain	ms 831				
J	Bibliothèque Nationale de France	Paris, France	ms esp. 225	Cançoner d'obres enamorades			
K	Biblioteca de Catalunya	Barcelona, Spain	ms 10				Biblioteca Digital de Catalunya
L	Biblioteca de Catalunya	Barcelona, Spain	ms 9				Biblioteca Digital de Catalunya
N	Biblioteca de l'Ateneu	Barcelona, Spain	ms 1	Cançoner de l'Ateneu	15th century		BAB Digital
O^{1}	Biblioteca Universitària	Valencia, Spain	9297				
O^{2}	Hispanic Society of America	New York City, United States	B 2281				
O^{3}	Biblioteca Universitaria	Salamanca, Spain	ms 2244				Gestión del Repositorio Documental de la Universidad de Salamanca
O^{4}	Bibliothèque Nationale de France	Paris, France	ms esp. 479				
O^{5}	Biblioteca de Catalunya	Barcelona, Spain	ms 2025				Biblioteca Digital de Catalunya
O^{6}	Biblioteca Nacional	Madrid, Spain	ms 2985				
O^{7}	Biblioteca Nacional	Madrid, Spain	ms 3695				
O^{8}	Biblioteca de El Escorial	El Escorial, Spain	ms LIII 26				
P	Biblioteca Universitaria	Zaragoza, Spain	ms 184	Cançoner de la Universitat de Saragossa			
Q	Bibliothèque Nationale de France	Paris, France	ms esp. 229				
R	Bibliothèque Nationale de France	Paris, France	ms esp. 226				
S^{1}	Biblioteca del Monestir	Montserrat, Spain	ms 991	Cançoner del Marquès de Barberà			Biblioteca Virtual Joan Lluís Vives
S^{2}	Biblioteca de Catalunya	Barcelona, Spain	ms 1030				
T	Hispanic Society of America	New York City, USA	ms B 2280				
U	Biblioteca Universitària	Valencia, Spain	88419	Codex de Mayans			
X^{1}	Biblioteca Universitaria	Barcelona, Spain	ms 125	Jardinet d'Orats			Biblioteca Patronial Digital
X^{2}	Wren Library	Cambridge, UK	ms R 1417	Jardinet d'Orats			Wren Digital Library
Y	Biblioteca del Palacio Real	Madrid, Spain	MS 2 F5	Cancionero de Palacio			
Z							
b^{1}	Biblioteca Nazionale	Turin, Italy	ms G-II-34	Blandin de Cornualha			
b^{2}	Bibliothèque Nationale de France	Paris, France	fr. 14973				
b^{3}	Biblioteca de Catalunya	Barcelona, Spain	ms 479				
c	Arxiu de la Corona d'Aragó	Barcelona, Spain	Ripoll 129	Cançoneret de Ripoll			
d^{1}	Biblioteca Universitària	Palma de Mallorca, Spain					
d^{2}	Col·legi de la Sapiència	Palma de Mallorca, Spain					
d^{3}	Biblioteca Apostolica Vaticana	Vatican City	Chigi E.4108				
d^{4}	Bayerische Staatsbibliothek	Munich, Germany	lat. 10538				
d^{5}	Biblioteca Ambrosiana	Milan, Italy	lat. H 8 inf.				
d^{6}	Biblioteca del Collegio di San Isidoro	Rome, Italy	1/18				
d^{7}	Biblioteca del Collegio di San Isidoro	Rome, Italy	1/22				
d^{9}	Biblioteca dell'Accademia Nazionale dei Lincei e Corsiniana	Rome, Italy	44.A.3				
d^{10}	Biblioteca del Collegio di San Isidoro	Rome, Italy	1/95				
d^{11}	Biblioteca Apostolica Vaticana	Vatican City	Lat. 9344				
d^{12}	Biblioteca Apostolica Vaticana	Vatican City	Lat. 10275				
d^{13}	British Library	London, UK	Add. 16431				
d^{14}	British Library	London, UK	Add. 16432				
d^{15}	British Library	London, UK	Add. 16430				
d^{16}	Biblioteca de la Causa Pia Lul·liana	Palma de Mallorca, Spain					
d^{17}	Societat Arqueològica Lul·liana	Palma de Mallorca, Spain					
d^{18}	Societat Arqueològica Lul·liana	Palma de Mallorca, Spain					
d^{19}	Biblioteca Universitària	Palma de Mallorca, Spain					
d^{20}	Societat Arqueològica Lul·liana	Palma de Mallorca, Spain					
d^{21}	Biblioteca Ambrosiana	Milan, Italy	D 465 inf.				
d^{22}	Biblioteca Universitària	Palma de Mallorca, Spain					
d^{23}	Biblioteca Universitària	Palma de Mallorca, Spain					
d^{24}	Biblioteca Universitària	Palma de Mallorca, Spain					
d^{25}	Bayerische Staatsbibliothek	Munich, Germany	lat. 10591				
d^{27}	Bayerische Staatsbibliothek	Munich, Germany	ms 612 hisp. 69				
d^{28}	Deutsche Staatsbibliothek	Berlin, Germany	ms hisp. Quart. 63				
d^{29}	Seminarbibliothek	Mainz, Germany					
d^{30}	Biblioteca Colombina	Seville, Spain	Y-129-7				
e^{1}	Biblioteca Nazionale Centrale di Firenze	Florence, Italy	Conv. Soppr. G-4313				
e^{2}	Real Academia de la Historia	Madrid, Spain	Est. 55 gr. 1a, n. 15				
e^{3}	Societat Arqueològica Lul·liana	Palma de Mallorca, Spain	ms 8 s/n				
f^{2}	Biblioteca Universitaria	Barcelona, Spain	ms 759				
h	Biblioteca Capitular	Valencia, Spain	ms lat (con una poesia catalana)				
i^{1}	Bibliothèque Municipale	Marseille, France	catal. p. 298, n. 2				
i^{2}	Arxiu Capitular	Barcelona, Spain	ms 23				
i^{3}	Arxiu Capitular	Barcelona, Spain					Cant de la Sibil·la
i^{4}		Barcelona, Spain	ms lat. (con poesie catalane)				
k	Biblioteca Universitaria Ventimigliana	Catania, Italy	ms 92				
l	Biblioteca Nacional de España	Madrid, Spain	ms 10264				
m	Biblioteca de Catalunya	Barcelona, Spain	ms 482				
n^{1}	Biblioteca Universitaria	Barcelona, Spain	ms 123				
n^{2}	Arxiu Capitular	Girona, Spain					
n^{3}	Arxiu de la corona d'Aragó	Barcelona, Spain	ms 26				
n^{4}	Arxiu de la Corona d'Aragó	Barcelona, Spain	memorial n. 49				
n^{5}	Arxiu de la Corona d'Aragó	Barcelona, Spain	memorial n. 55				
o	Biblioteca Universitaria	Barcelona, Spain	ms 54				
p	Biblioteca Universitaria	Barcelona, Spain	ms 68				
q	Biblioteca de Catalunya	Barcelona, Spain	ms 1716				
r^{1}	Arxiu de la Corona d'Aragó	Barcelona, Spain	ms Sant Cugat 27				
r^{2}	Bibliothèque Nationale de France	Paris, France	lat. 6652				
s	Biblioteca Apostolica Vaticana	Vatican City	Lat. 4806				
t	Biblioteca de la Capella del Palau	Barcelona, Spain					Esacs d'Amor
u	Biblioteca Capitular	Barcelona, Spain	ms 6				
v	Biblioteca de Catalunya	Barcelona, Spain	ms 485				
x^{1}	Biblioteca de Catalunya	Barcelona, Spain	ms 1000				
x^{2}	Bibliothèque Nationale de France	Paris, France	nouv. acq. 4232				
x^{3}	Biblioteca de Catalunya	Barcelona, Spain	ms 729				
x^{4}	Biblioteca Colombina	Seville, Spain	7-7-6				
x^{5}	Biblioteca de Catalunya	Barcelona, Spain	ms 451				
x^{6}	Bibliothèque Nationale de France	Paris, France	esp. 472				
x^{7}	Biblioteca Universitaria	Barcelona, Spain	ms 1029				
x^{8}	Biblioteca de Catalunya	Barcelona, Spain	ms 372				
x^{9}		Madrid, Spain					Vida de Sancta Margarida
x^{10}	Biblioteca de Catalunya	Barcelona, Spain	ms 1957				
x^{11}	Biblioteca del Monestir de Sant Pere de les Puel·les	Barcelona, Spain					
y	Biblioteca de Montserrat	Montserrat, Spain	ms 1	Llibre Vermell de Montserrat	1396–1399		Biblioteca Virtual Miguel de Cervantes
z^{a}	Biblioteca de Catalunya	Barcelona, Spain	ms 3	Cançoner de vides de sants			
z^{b}	Biblioteca Municipal	Valencia, Spain					

=== French ===
- Cangé Chansonnier
- Cappella Giulia Chansonnier
- Casanatense chansonnier
- Chansonnier Cordiforme
- Chansonnier de Arras
- Chansonnier du Roi (also Occitan)
- Chansonnier Nivelle de la Chaussée
- Copenhagen Chansonnier
- Dijon Chansonnier
- Florentine Chansonnier
- Laborde Chansonnier
- Mellon Chansonnier
- Noailles Chansonnier
- Seville Chansonnier
- Wolfenbüttel Chansonnier

=== Italian ===
- Cancionero de Montecassino

=== Occitan ===
- Cançoner Gil
- Cançoner Vega-Aguiló
- Chansonnier de Saint-Germain-des-Prés
- Philipps Manuscript
- Poetarum Provinciali

=== Galician-Portuguese ===
- Cancioneiro da Ajuda
- Cancioneiro da Biblioteca Nacional
- Cancioneiro da Vaticana
- Pergaminho Sharrer (fragment)
- Pergaminho Vindel see Martin Codax

=== Portuguese ===
- Cancioneiro de Belém
- Cancioneiro de Elvas
- Cancioneiro de Lisboa
- Cancioneiro de Paris

=== Spanish ===
- Cancionero de Baena
- Cancionero de la Colombina
- Cancionero de Medinaceli
- Cancionero de Palacio
- Cancionero de Segovia
