= Cancionero de la Colombina =

Spanish musical manuscript

The Cancionero de la Colombina or Cancionero Musical de la Colombina (CMC) is a Spanish manuscript (Ms. 7-1-28) containing Renaissance music from the second half of the 15th century.

The manuscript was copied during the reign of the Catholic Monarchs, possibly between the 1460s and the 1480s. Therefore, it predates the more famous Cancionero de Palacio. The first half of the manuscript is the work of two main scribes, and the second half was completed by six other scribes. It originally comprised 106 folios, 8 of which are lost. The general condition of the remaining folios is less than satisfactory. A title added on a later period reads "Cantilenas vulgares puestas en musica por varios Españoles" (Popular melodies set to music by various Spaniards).

The Cancionero de la Colombina has been related with the court of the powerful dukes of Medina Sidonia who lived in Seville and had contacts with Juan de Triana, the main composer of the manuscript.

In 1534 it was bought by the second son of Christopher Columbus, the bibliophile Ferdinand Columbus, who added it to his rich Sevillian library of more than 15,000 volumes known by the name of "Columbine Library" (in Spanish, "Biblioteca Colombina"). After his death, the library was transferred to the Seville Cathedral, where it remains up to this day.

The Cancionero currently contains 95 musical settings, some of which are incomplete. Of this total, 53 remain anonymous. The authorship of several works could be established because they had been properly attributed in other cancioneros, especially the Cancionero de Palacio and the Cancionero de Montecassino.

The repertory in the manuscript is varied. Among the musical genres can be found canciones, villancicos, romances and ensaladas. Many of the villancicos and canciones are sacred, mostly Marian. Two of the works are in French and 12 are liturgical compositions in Latin. There are also two short versions in Castilian of the Song of the Sibyl ("El Cant de la Sibil·la"), nos. 73 and 91 ("Juysio fuerte será dado").

== List of works ==
Nº	Title	Voices	Composer	Remarks
1	Amor de penada gloria	3	Anonymous	
2	Pues con sobra de tristura	4	Enrique	
3	Canten todos bos en grito	1-2	Anonymous	(incomplete)
4	Gentil dama non se gana	3	Johannes Cornago	
5	O pena que me conbates	1-2	Juan de Triana	(incomplete)
6	Muy crueles bozes dan	3	Anonymous	
7	Señora, non me culpeys	3	Anonymous	
8	Doncella por cuyo amor	3	J. Rodríguez Torote	
9	Nunca fue pena mayor	3	Juan de Urrede	Text by García Álvarez de Toledo
10	Dónde estás, que non te veo	3	Johannes Cornago	
11	Muy triste será mi vida	4	Juan de Urrede	
12	Oya tu merçed y crea	3	Anonymous	
13	Tanto quanto me desplase	1-2	Anonymous	(incomplete)
14	Qu'es mi vida, preguntays	4	Johannes Cornago / Johannes Ockeghem	
15	Non puedo si non querer	3	Anonymous	
16	Mis tristes, tristes sospiros	3	Anonymous	
17	Ay que non sé rremediarme	3	Juan de León	
18	Pues que Dios te fizo tal	3	Johannes Cornago	
19	Con temor vivo ojos tristes	3	Juan de Triana	
20	Siempre creçe mi serviros	3	Juán Fernández de Madrid	
21	Quanto mi vida biviere	3	Anonymous	
22	Señora, qual soy venido	3	Johannes Cornago / Juan de Triana	Text by Íñigo López de Mendoza
23	De mi perdida esperança	3	Juan de Triana	
24	Pues mi dicha non consiente	3	Belmonte	
25	Vive leda si podrás	3	Anonymous	
26	Dama mi grand querer	3	Móxica	
27	Porque más sin duda creas	3	Johannes Cornago	
28	No puedes quexar, amor	3	Juan de Triana	
29	Laudate eum omnes angeli	2	Anonymous	
30	Mi querer tanto vos quiere	4	Enrique	
31	Mirando dama fermosa	3	Anonymous	
32	De vos y de mi quejoso	3	Juan de Urrede	
33	Andad, passiones, andad	3	Pedro de Lagarto	
34	Quién vos dio tal señorio	4	Juan de Triana	
35	Ya de amor era partido	3	Juan de Triana	
36	De vida que tanto enoja	1-2	Anonymous	
37	Pues no mejora mi suerte	1-2	Anonymous	(incomplete)
38	Al dolor de mi cuydado	3	Juan Pérez de Gijón	
39	Omni potentem	2	Anonymous	
40	No tenga nadie sperança	3	Hurtado de Xerés	
41	(no title)	2	Anonymous	
42	Con temor de la mudança	3	Hurtado de Xerés	
43	No consiento ni me plaze	3	Juan de Triana	
44	Quanta gloria me dio veros	1-2	Anonymous	(incomplete)
45	(no title)	4	Anonymous	
46	Agnus	4	Anonymous	
47	Sanctus	4	Anonymous	
48	Dime, triste coraçón	4	Francisco de la Torre	
49	Amar es servir	3	Anonymous	
50	Mortales son los dolores	3	Anonymous	
51	Pensamiento ve do vas	4	Anonymous	
52	Olvida tu perdiçión	3	Anonymous	
53	Quien tiene vida en esperança	3	Anonymous	
54	Niña y viña	3	Anonymous	
55	O gloriosa Domina	3	Anonymous	
56	Es la vida que cobré	3	Anonymous	
57	Propiñan de Melyor	3	Anonymous	Instrumental
58	A quello trate domingo	3	Anonymous	
59	Nuevas te traygo carillo	3	Anonymous / Juan del Encina	Instrumental
60	(no title)	1	Anonymous	
61	Los hombres con gran plazer	3	Anonymous	
62	Merçed, merçed le pidamos	3	Anonymous	
63	Salve, sancta parens	4	Anonymous	
64	Reyna muy esclareçida	3	Anonymous	
65	Buenas nuevas de alegria	3	Anonymous	
66	Deus in adjutorium	3	Juan de Triana	
67	Tu valer me da gran guera	3	Juanes	
68	In exitu Israel de Egipto	4	Anonymous	
69	Maravillome del syno me del santiguome	3	Juan de Triana	
70	Pinguele rrespinguete	3	Juan de Triana	
71	La moça que las cabras cría	4	Juan de Triana	
72	A los maytines era	5	Anonymous	
73	Juysio fuerte será dado	4	Anonymous	
74	Virgen dina de honor	4	Anonymous	
75	Que bonito niño chiquito	4	Anonymous	
76	(no title)	3	Anonymous	
77	Qui fecit celum	3	Anonymous	
78	Ay, Santa Maria	3	Anonymous	
79	Dic nobis Maria	4	Anonymous	
80	Benedicamus Domino	3	Juan de Triana	
81	Benedicamus Domino	3	Juan de Triana	
82	Juste judex Jesu Christe	3	Juan de Triana	
83	(no title)	3	Anonymous	
84	(no title)	4	Anonymous	
85	Quia	3	Anonymous	Instrumental
86	¿Querer vieja yo? / Non puedo dexar / Que non sé filar	3	Juan de Triana	
87	De la momera je n'estay	4	Johannes Ockeghem	
88	Por beber, comadre	3	Juan de Triana	
89	Aquella buena mujer	3	Juan de Triana	
90	Dinos, madre del donsel	3	Juan de Triana	
91	Juysio fuerte será dado	4	Juan de Triana	
92	¿Cómo no le andaré yo?	3	Anonymous	
93	Pues que non tengo	3	Anonymous	
94	Le pure amant qui est	3	Anonymous	Instrumental
95	No tenga con vos amor	3	Anonymous	

== Bibliography ==
- Historia de la música española. Vol 2. Desde el Ars Nova hasta 1600. Samuel Rubio. Alianza Editorial. Madrid. 1983.
- El cancionero musical de la Colombina (siglo XV). Transcripción y estudio por Miguel Querol Gavaldá. 2a ed. Madrid. 1989. Ministerio de Educación y Ciencia. Monumentos históricos de la música española Collection.
- Anglés, Higinio. La música en la Corte de los Reyes Católicos. C.S.I.C. Madrid. 1960
- Gómez Fernández, Lucía. Música, nobleza y mecenazgo: los duques de Medina Sidonia en Sevilla y Sanlúcar de Barrameda (1445-1615). Universidad de Cádiz. Cádiz. 2017.
- Spanish Music in the Age of Columbus. Robert Louis Stevenson. Hyperion Pr. 1979. 0883558726
- Sources, MS, §IX, 22: Renaissance polyphony: Spanish and Portuguese cathedral manuscripts. Grove Music Online.
