= Cancioneiro de Lisboa =

Portuguese Renaissance–Era manuscript of music

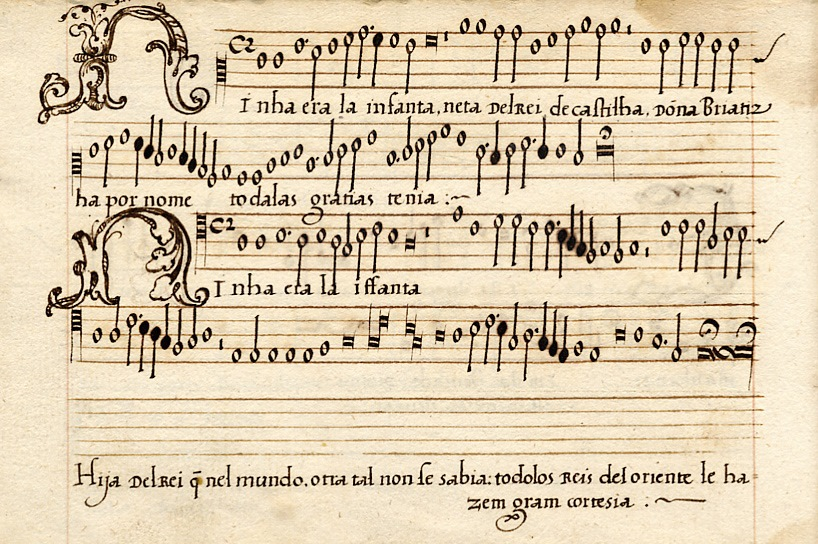

Cancioneiro musical da Biblioteca Nacional or simply Cancioneiro de Lisboa is the name given to the manuscript CIC 60 which is kept in the Portuguese National Library, in Lisbon. It is one of the four Portuguese Renaissance songbooks of Portuguese music (along with the Elvas Songbook, the Belém Songbook and the Paris Songbook). It was produced between 1530 and 1550 and contains 72 folios sized 96x146 mm each. The current cover is from the 17th century. Some of the folios have suffered corrosion from the ink and the music in them can't be completely recovered.

This songbook compiles both secular and sacred music of the 15th and 16th centuries. There is not a single reference on composers, but some works are known to be composed by Francisco de Peñalosa, Juan de Anchieta, Pedro de Escobar and others.
