= Juan de Triana =

Spanish composer

Juan de Triana (fl. 1460 – 1490, died 28 January 1494) was a Spanish composer of the Renaissance period, active in the second half of the 15th century during the reign of the Catholic Monarchs. Pope Sixtus IV issued a bull on 9 February 1478 that listed De Triana as Prebendary of the Cathedral of Sevilla for at least a year before. He later moved to the Cathedral of Toledo, where it was recorded that in 1483 he was a teacher of six children in the Cathedral, with a salary of 18,000 maravedíes, a significant quantity at the time. Possibly Triana held this position until 1490, when he was replaced by Pedro de Lagarto. He died in Seville on 28 January 1494, and was buried near the gate of the chapel of the Virgen de la Antigua. In his will, he left a bequest to endow a chaplaincy to sing twenty-five masses a month for his soul at the altar of San Juan Bautista, near his place of burial.

== Works ==
Twenty works by Triana have been preserved, all in the Cancionero de la Colombina. Four of the works are religious and the remaining are secular. Three of them also have replicas in the Cancionero de Palacio. One of the religious pieces is a fragment of the Song of the Sibyl in Castilian, and the others are liturgical texts in Latin. The compositions have features that are common to the Iberian musicians of the generation before.

Nº	Work	Voices	Musical form	Sources	Recordings	Comments
Religious works
1	Benedicamus Domino	3	song-motet	CMC(80)	TRI
2	Benedicamus Domino	3	song-motet	CMC(81)	TRI
3	Juste Judex Jesu Christe	3	song-motet	CMC	TRI
4	Juysio fuerte sera dado	4	song	CMC	TRI, UMB, SIB	Brief fragment of Canto de la Sibila.
Secular works
5	Aquella buena muger	3	carol	CMC, CMP	TRI
6	Con temor vivo ojos tristes	3	carol	CMC	TRI
7	De mi perdida esperança	3	carol	CMC	TRI
8	Deus in adiutorium	3	rondó	CMC	TRI
9	Dinos madre del donsel	3	rondó	CMC	BER, TRI, COL, MAG, ISA
10	La moça que las cabras cria	4	carol form	CMC	TRI
11	Maravillome del syno me del santiguome	3	carol	CMC	HMC, TRI
12	No consiento ni me plaze	3	carol	CMC	TRI
13	No puedes quexar amor	3		CMC	TRI
14	O pena que me combates	3	carol	CMC	TRI	Incomplete
15	Pinguele rrespinguete	3	rondó	CMC	ARE, TRI, COL
16	Por beber comadre	3	carol	CMC, CMP	TRI
17	Querer vieja yo / Non puedo dexar / Que non se filar	3		CMC	TRI, ARE, COL	Each voice sings a different text, an unusual arrangement for the period.
18	Quien vos dio tal señorio	4		CMC	TRI, COL
19	Señora qual soy venido	3	carol	CMC, CMP	ARE, COL, SFM, TRI	In the CMC version, the name Juan Cornago appears next to the treble, and Juan de Triana next to the bass. The CMP version is listed as anonymous, but the musicologist Higinio Anglés, attributes the manuscript to Cornago. (Text from Íñigo López de Mendoza, 1st Marquess of Santillana).
20	Ya de amor era partido	3	carol	CMC	ARE, TRI

These works are found in the following sources:

- CMP - Madrid, Biblioteca Real, MS II - 1335 (Cancionero de Palacio) (E-Mp II-1335)
- CMC - Sevilla, Catedral Metropolitana, Biblioteca Capitular y Colombina, Ms. 7-I-28 (E-S 7-I-28)

== Discography ==
- ?? - [AER] El Cancionero Musical de la Colombina, Renaissance Quartet. Main Instrument Panel Renaissance. MEC 1011 CD
- 1969 - [SFM] Musica Iberica I, Música Ibérica I until the fifteenth century - Monodia XII / XII, XIII century Polifonia, Villancicos XV century (John Urreda, Juan Cornago). früher der Musik Studio . EMI / Odeon J 063-20114 (LP).
- 1977 - [BER] Canciones Españolas, Teresa Berganza, Narciso Yepes, Felix Lavilla. Deutsche Grammophon 435 648-2.
- 1990 - [TRI] Juan de Triana: La Musica en la Era del Descubrimiento III, Ziryab Workshop. CAL-5019 Dial Records.
- 1991 - [HMC] Cornago: Missa de la mapa mundi, The Newberry Consort. Harmonia Mundi USA 907083.
- 1992 - [COL] El Cancionero de la Colombina, 1451-1506, Music at the time of Christopher Columbus, Hesperion XX. Jordi Savall. Astrée (Naïve) ES 9954.
- 1996 - [SIB] El Canto de la Sibila II, Galicia - Castilla. La Capella Reial de Catalunya. Jordi Savall, Montserrat Figueras . Astrée "Naïve" (Auvidis) ES 9942.
- 1999 - [UMB] Chaconne: Renaissance Spain in the Age of Empire, Ex Umbris. Dorian 93207.
- 2002 - [MAG] Iudicii Signum, Ministrers Capella . Carles Magraner. Licanus "Capella de Ministrers" CDM 0203.
- 2004 - [ISA] Isabel I, Reina de Castilla, Lights and Shadows in the time of the first great Renaissance Queen 1451-1504. La Capella Reial de Catalunya and Hespèrion XXI. Jordi Savall . Alia Vox AV 9838.
