= Manuel of Portugal =

Manuel of Portugal may refer to:

== Kings ==
- Manuel I of Portugal (1469–1521), King of Portugal from 1495 to 1521
- Manuel II of Portugal (1889–1932), last King of Portugal from 1908 to 1910

== Pretenders ==
- Manuel, Hereditary Prince of Portugal (c. 1568 - 1638), son of pretender António, Prior of Crato

== Infantes ==
- Manuel, Prince of Portugal (1531–1537), son of John III of Portugal
- João Manuel, Prince of Portugal (1537–1554), son of John III of Portugal
- Infante Manuel, Count of Ourém (1697–1766), son of Peter II of Portugal

== Other ==
- Manuel de Portugal (poet), (1516–1606), Portuguese writer, poet and diplomat
