= Manuel de Portugal (poet) =

Portuguese writer, poet and diplomat

Dom Manuel of Portugal, Comendador of Vimioso (1516–1606) was a Portuguese writer, poet and diplomat of the 16th century.

== Life ==
Manuel was born c. 1516 in Évora to Joana de Vilhena and Dom Francisco of Portugal (1485–1549), 1st Count of Vimioso. He received the title of Comendador of Vimioso and of São Pedro de Calvelo, and was highly regarded by John Manuel, Prince of Portugal, father of the future king Sebastian of Portugal. During his reign, Sebastian appointed him Ambassador of Portugal in Castile. After the unfortunate death of King Sebastian at the Battle of Alcácer Quibir, Dom Manuel took the side of Dom António, Prior of Crato in the succession crisis that followed.

== Literary works ==
Among his known works are 17 books of songs, odes, plantos, octaves, etc. Mostly written in Spanish, his work was eminently of a moral and ascetic nature. The compilation Obras de Don Manoel de Portugal ("Works by Dom Manuel of Portugal"), published in 1605, ended with a Tratado breve da oração ("Brief treaty on prayer") written in Portuguese. In the treaty, Dom Manuel summarizes the doctrines of the greatest Christian thinkers about prayer.

Dom Manuel was esteemed by his peers: the poet Sá de Miranda dedicated to him the eclogue Encantamento, and Luís de Camões, in Ode VII, considered him as deserving "immortal glory". His poem Aquella voluntad que se ha rendido, written around 1555 for his beloved Dona Francisca de Aragão, was set to music and included in the songbooks of Elvas and Belém.

== See also ==
- Sebastian of Portugal
- João Manuel
- Crown of Castile
