= Capela Real =

The Capela Real was the royal chapel and musical establishment of the kings of Portugal in Lisbon.

The capela played an important role in the development of the music history of Portugal from its foundation by Dom Dinis in 1299.

== Singing in the chapel ==
Dom Duarte (1391–1438), as Edward, King of Portugal, elaborated a Regimen (Ordenaçam) of the Chapel, which indicates that the standard practice was three-voice singing. His son, Afonso V (1432–1481), sent the mestre de capela Álvaro Afonso, to the court of Henry VI of England (1421–1471) in order to get a copy of the statutes, regimen and liturgy practiced in the English Chapel Royal. The detailed description written by William Say is kept at Évora.

== Mestres de capela ==
Later composers serving the capela included Domenico Scarlatti who from 1719 until his death served as mestre de capela where his responsibilities included teaching the Infanta Maria Barbara and the king's younger brother, Don Antonio.
