= Cançoner del Marquès de Barberà =

15th-century songbook

The Cançoner del Marquès de Barberà is a medieval chansonnier book compiled in the last third of the 15th century by Francesc Galceran de Pinós i Fenollet.

It includes pieces by Castilian and Catalan authors made between 1438 and 1470. The codex, which retains the original binding, has passed through the archives of the Marquès of Barberà and the Library of Catalonia, is in the library of the monastery of Montserrat since 1956. The songbook is compiled by one hand. A section with anonymous pieces presents author variants, in poems to be attributed to the compiler. In the Catalan tradition of songbooks, the acronym given by Massó i Torrents is 'S1'. In the Castilian tradition of songbooks, the acronym given by Brian Dutton is 'BM1'.
