= Cancionero de Montecassino =

Neapolitan manuscript of music

The Cancionero Musical de Montecassino (Montecassino, Biblioteca dell'Abbazia, 871), known by the abbreviation (CMM), is an important Neapolitan music manuscript from the 1480s. It contains an international repertoire of sacred and secular music performed at the Aragonese Court of Naples, including many otherwise unknown compositions by composers such as Juan Cornago, Loyset Compère, and Guillaume Du Fay.

== Contents and structure ==
The manuscript is a composite of several originally separate fascicles bound together in the late 17th century. It contains approximately 144 pieces, including masses, motets, Magnificats, and secular genres such as chansons and villancicos in Latin, Italian, French, and Spanish.
