= Cancioneiro de Paris =

Renaissance songbook of Portuguese music

The Cancioneiro de Paris (Paris Songbook – École Nationale Supérieure des Beaux-Arts, manuscript Masson 56) is one of the four Renaissance songbooks of Portuguese music from the 16th century. It is one important source of secular music of the Portuguese Renaissance and the largest one of Portuguese secular Renaissance music.

It contains 130 secular villancicos and cantigas. Out of them, 55 works are polyphonic (2, 3 and 4 voices), while the other 75 works have only their melody copied.

All works are anonymous, but it is known that some of them were composed by the Portuguese composer Pedro de Escobar.
