= Domingo Antonio Velasco =

Italian painter

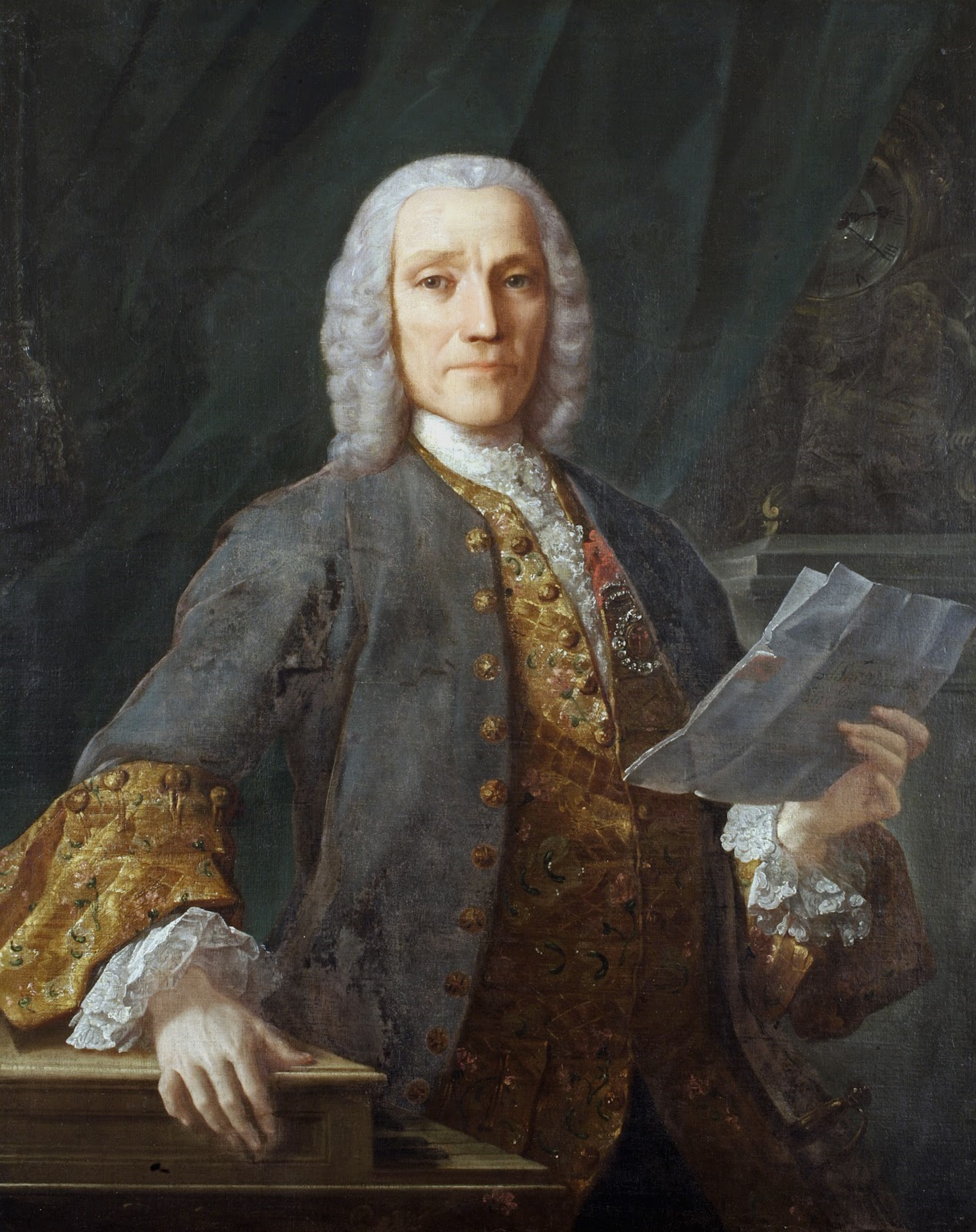
Velasco's portrait of Domenico Scarlatti, made around 1739 after he received from D. João V the Cross of the Order of Santiago.

Domingo Antonio Velasco was an Italian painter. He was best known for his portrait of composer Domenico Scarlatti, which commemorates the musician's initiation into the Order of Santiago on 21 April 1738 by King John V of Portugal.
