= Cancioneiro de Elvas =

Renaissance songbook of Portuguese music

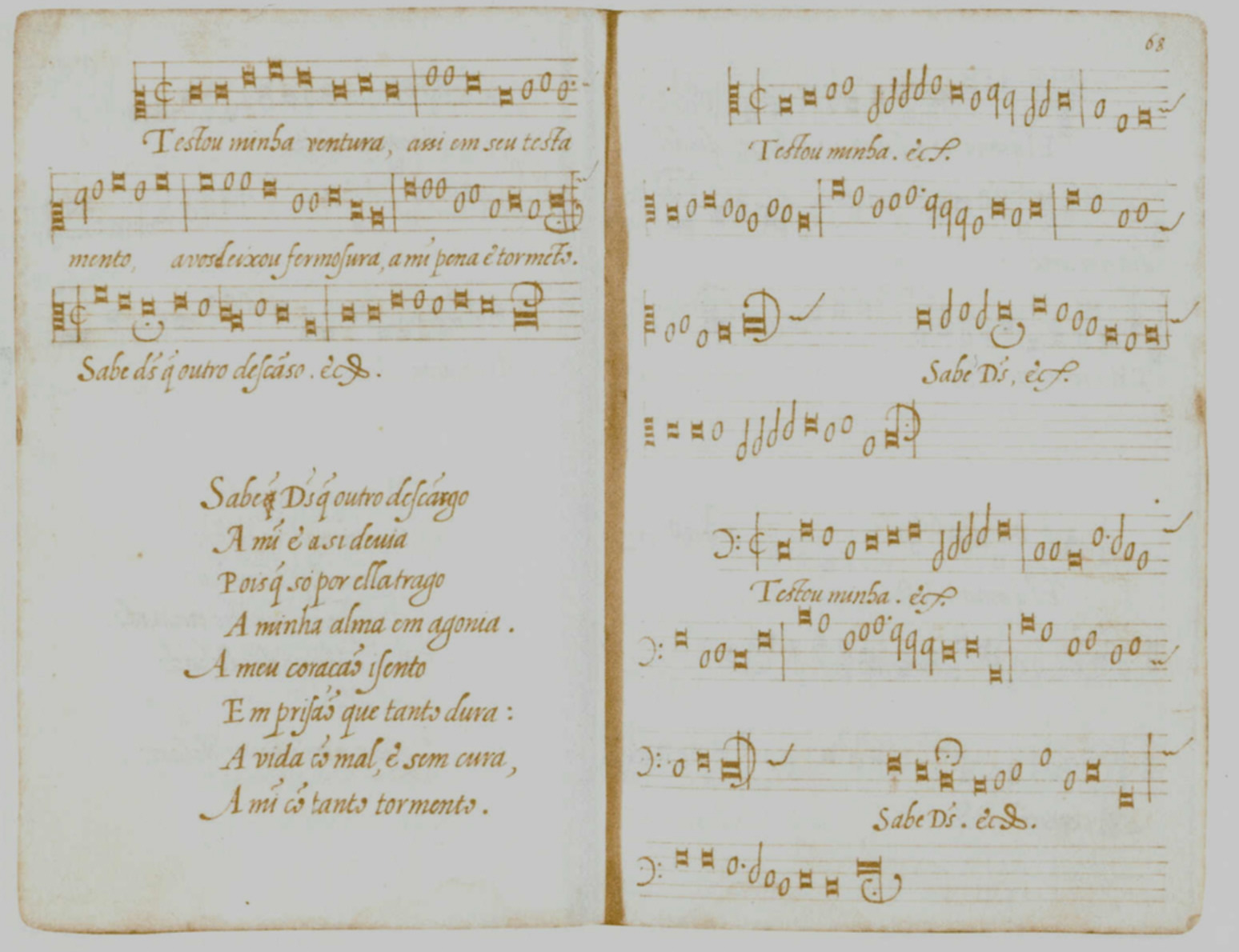
Testou minha ventura, one of the 65 anonymous works compiled in the Elvas Songbook

The Cancioneiro de Elvas (in English: Elvas Songbook) is one of the four Renaissance songbooks of Portuguese music from the 16th century - along with the Lisbon Songbook, the Belém Songbook, and the Paris songbook. It is one important source of secular music from the Iberian Renaissance.

The songs are composed in Portuguese and Spanish languages.

== General description ==
The Elvas Songbook was found in 1928 in the library of Elvas, by the musicologist Manuel Joaquim. It was copied in the 16th century and is divided in two parts:

- The first part is musical: contains 65 works of polyphonic (3 voices) secular music from Portugal and Spain. The poems used are villancicos and cantigas.
- The second part is literary: contains 36 poems without music.

The musical part of the songbook has been studied and transcribed by three musicologists - Manuel Joaquim, Manuel Morais and Gil Miranda.

== Dating of the Songbook ==
There are no dates in the manuscript, therefore it is impossible to know the precise date of compilation. However, some factors can help us to narrow the time frame:

- There is a song in the songbook which uses a poem written by the poet Dom Manuel de Portugal, dedicated to his beloved Dona Francisca de Aragão. This poem is known to have been written in c. 1555;
- The watermark in the pages of the manuscript is similar to one used in Italy until the decade of 1570.

Thus, we can conclude that the Elvas Songbook was copied between the decades of 1560 and 1570, approximately.

== Composers ==
There is not a single reference on composers in the songbook: all works are anonymous. However, if we compare this songbook with other Iberian songbooks, it is possible to establish concordances and thus know which are the composers of 7 (maybe 8) works from the 65 compiled. They are:

- Juan del Encina (4 works)
- Pedro de Escobar (2 or 3 works)
- Pedro de Pastrana (1 work)
