= Cancioneiro de Belém =

Renaissance Portuguese songbook

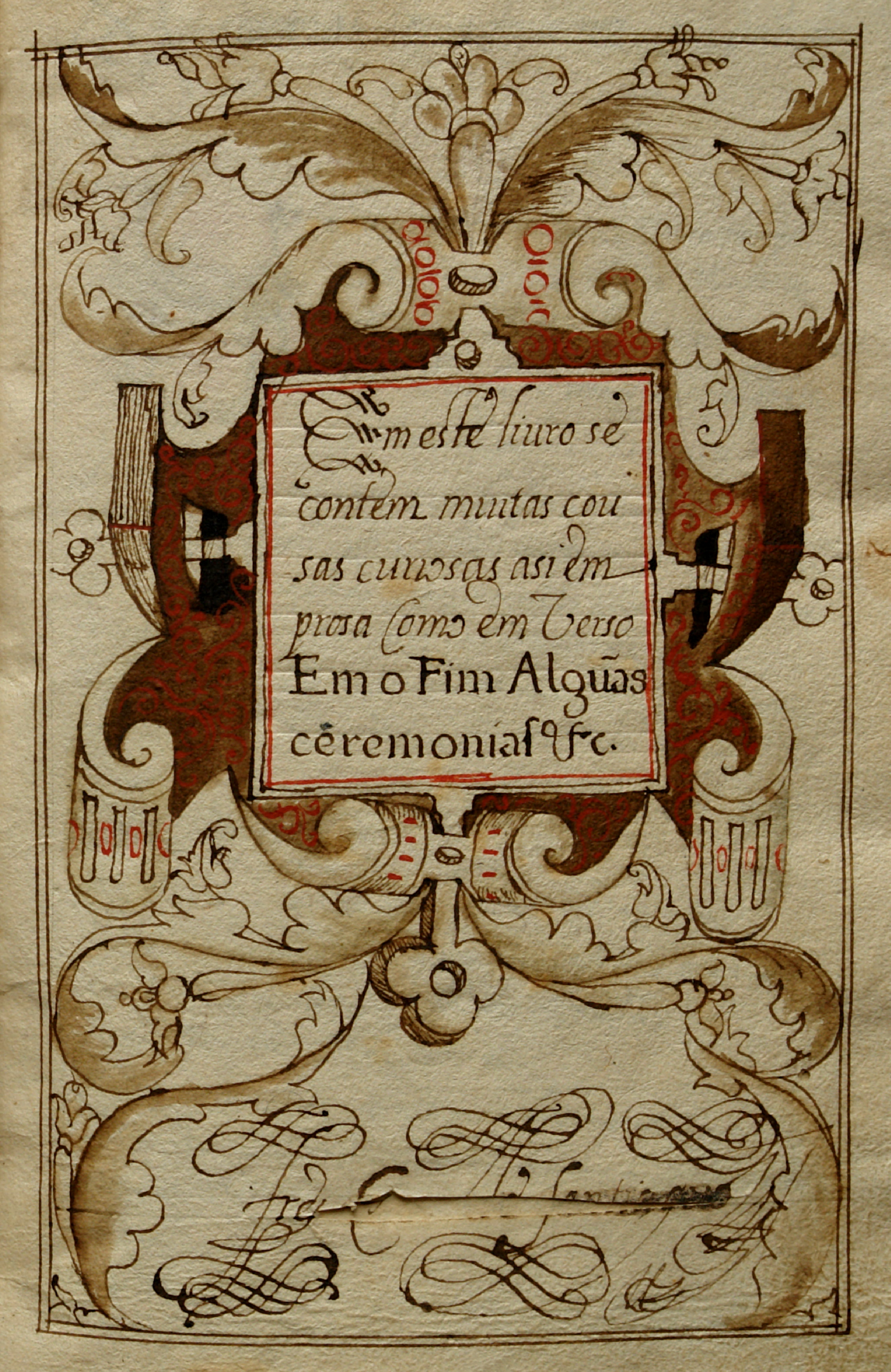
Title page

The Cancioneiro Musical de Belém (English: Belém Musical Songbook) or simply Cancioneiro de Belém (Santa Maria de Belém, Lisbon, National Archaeology Museum, Ms 3391) is a Portuguese Renaissance manuscript from the beginning of the 17th century.

== General description ==
This little manuscript with just 18 songs was found in the archives of the National Archaeology Museum, in Belém (Lisbon), by the end of the 1960s by professors Arthur Lee-Francis Askins and Jack Sage, specialists in Iberian lyric of the 16th century. It was later studied by Manuel Morais, who published in 1988 a critical edition of the cancioneiro, together with a musical transcription to modern notation of all eighteen songs.

Currently with 77 folios sized 191 x 130 mm, the songs proper are found between folios 58v and 74. In recent times (possibly in the 19th century) the manuscript received a brown leather cover, to which a title was added: Manuscriptos / Varios.

Inside the songbook, an inscription reads Porto, dia de S. Miguel, 603. (Porto, St. Michael's Day, i.e., 29 September 1603). In spite of that, the music therein is considerably older, being dated as belonging to the period between 1560 and 1580. This songbook contains the only Portuguese manuscript madrigals known to date, besides vilancetes, cantigas and two rare examples of sacred villancicos, one for Christmas (Pues a Dios humano vemos) and the other for the feast of Corpus Christi (O manjar bivo, dulçe i provechoso).

A few songs are also found in other manuscript sources, as for instance the Cancioneiro de Elvas, and in printed Spanish editions of the 16th century, but the majority of the works are unica, that is, found exclusively in this manuscript.

Among the poets that have been identified are Dom Manuel de Portugal (1516–1606) and the poet-composer Jorge de Montemor (c.1520-1561), as well as the Castilians Garcilaso de la Vega (1503–1536) and the little-known poet Cetina "the Nun".

== List of works ==
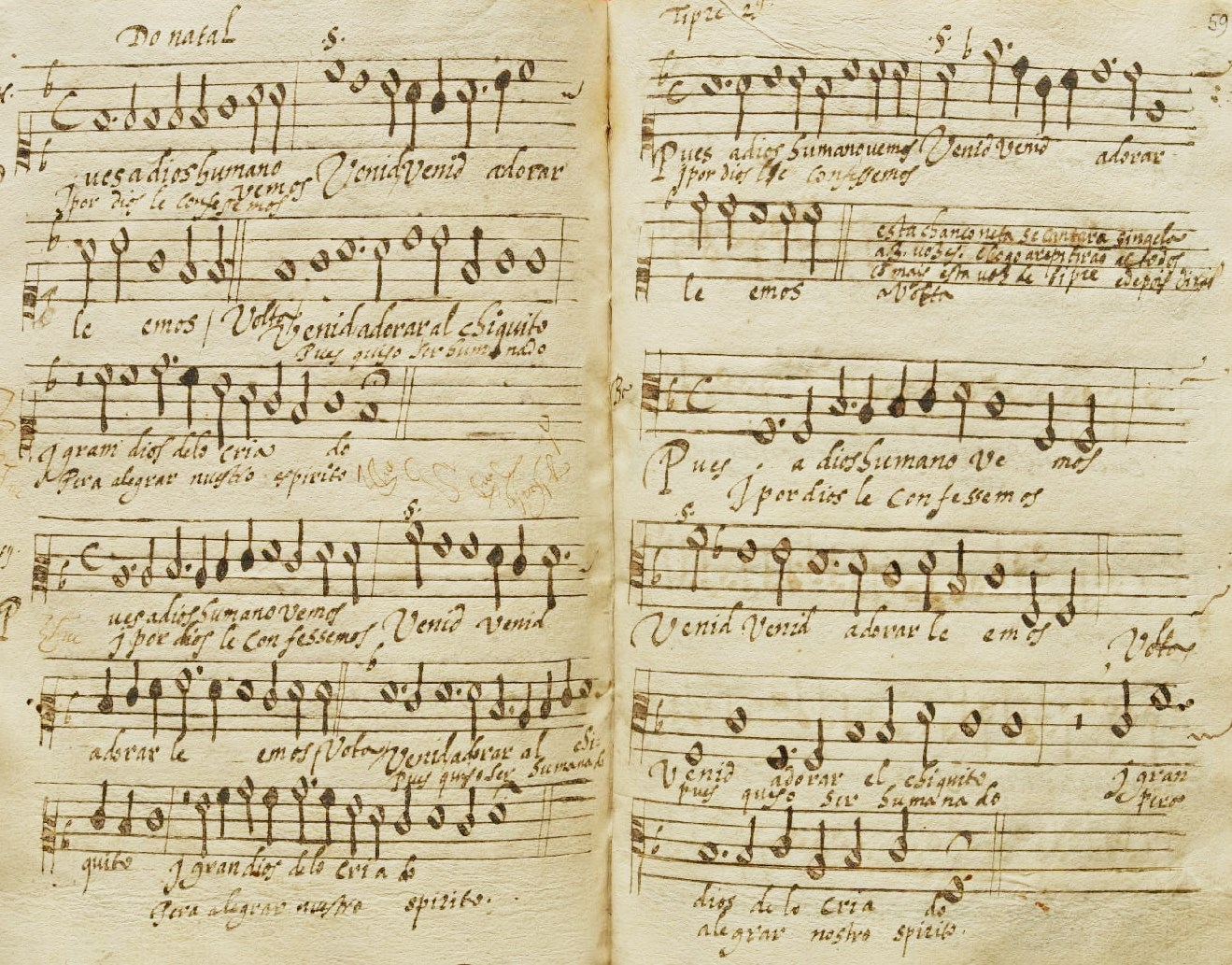
The villancico Pues a Dios humano vemos

Nº	Folio(s)	Title	Composer	Text	Language	Concordance	Recordings
1.	58v-59	Pues a Dios humano vemos	Anonymous		Spanish		SEG
2.	59v-60	Ay de mim sin ventura	Anonymous	Cetina "the Nun"	Spanish		SEG
3.	60v-63	Baxad, Señora los ojos	Anonymous		Spanish		SEG
4.	63v-64	[Oh] Dulçe suspiro mio	Anonymous		Spanish		SEG
5.	65	Venid a suspirar al verde prado	Anonymous		Spanish	CME	STU, SEG, UFF, BAL
6.	65v-66	Desperança vos vestistes	Anonymous		Portuguese		SEG
7.	66v	Dame [a]cogida en tu hato	Anonymous		Spanish	DAZ, ODA	SEG
8.	67	Oy[u]elos graçiosos	Anonymous		Spanish	CME	SEG
9.	67v	Mira que negro amor y que nonada	Anonymous		Spanish	CME	SEG
10.	68	Aquella voluntad que se ha rendido	Anonymous	Manuel de Portugal	Spanish	CME	SEG, UFF
11.	68v	Sabete Gil que me muero	Anonymous		Spanish		SEG
12.	69	En la peña, yunto la peña	Anonymous	Antonio de Villegas	Spanish		SEG
13.	69v-70	Qu[i]en te hizo Yuan pastor	Anonymous		Spanish	DAZ	SEG
14.	70v-71	Tierras mias ado nasci	Anonymous		Spanish	CML	SEG
15.	71v	O manjar bivo, dulçe i provechoso	Anonymous		Spanish		SEG
16.	72	De mi ventura quexoso	Anonymous		Spanish		SEG
17.	72v-73	O mas dura que marmor a mis quexas	Anonymous	Garcilaso de la Vega	Spanish		SEG
18.	73v-74	Flerida en cuja mano	Jorge de Montemor	Jorge de Montemor	Spanish		SEG

Concordance with other manuscripts:

- [CME] - Cancioneiro Musical de Elvas (P-Em 11793)
- [CML] - Cancioneiro de Lisboa (Cancioneiro Musical da Biblioteca Nacional) (Lisboa, Biblioteca Nacional C.I.C. 60) (P-Lm Res C.I.C. 60)
- [DAZ] - Libro de música de cifras para vihuela, intitulado El Parnaso (1576), Esteban Daza
- [ODA] - Odarum (Quas vulgo madrigales appellamus) (1561), Pere Alberc i Vila

== Discography ==
- 1964 - [STU] Frühe spanische Musik im "Goldenen Zeitalter". Studio der frühen Musik. Telefunken "Das Alte Werk" AWT 8039 (EP).
- 1988 - [SEG] Portuguese Mannerist Music - Cancioneiro Musical de Belém. Segréis de Lisboa. Movieplay.
- 1998 - [UFF] Música no tempo das Caravelas. Música Antiga da UFF.
- 2005 - [BAL] Love and Devotion - Iberian Music from the 13th to the 16th centuries. Il Dolce Ballo. Independent.
