= Pedro de Escobar =

Portuguese composer (1465 – 1535)

Pedro de Escobar (c. 1465 – after 1535), a.k.a. Pedro do Porto, was a Portuguese composer of the Renaissance, mostly active in Spain. He was one of the earliest and most skilled composers of polyphony in the Iberian Peninsula, whose music has survived.

== Life ==
He was born at Porto, Kingdom of Portugal, but nothing is known of his life until he entered the service of Isabella I of Castile in 1489. His surname is of Castilian origin, and maybe he was born to Castilian immigrants, or descendants, established in Porto. But Castilians regarded him as Portuguese.

He was a singer in the Catholic Queen's chapel for ten years, and clearly was working as a composer as well; in addition he was the only member of her chapel described in court records as Portuguese. In 1499 he returned to his native Portugal, but in 1507 received an offer of employment, which he accepted, as the maestro de capilla (chapel master in the Castilian language) at the cathedral in Seville.

While there he had charge of the choirboys, having to take care of their room and board in addition to having to teach them to sing; he complained of low pay, and eventually resigned. In 1521 he was working in Portugal, as mestre de capela (chapel master in Portuguese) for prince Dom Afonso, Cardinal-Infante of Portugal, son of Manuel I of Portugal. His career seems to have ended badly, however, for the final record of his life there is a mention in a document of 1535 that he was an alcoholic and living in squalor. He died in Évora.

== Music and influence ==
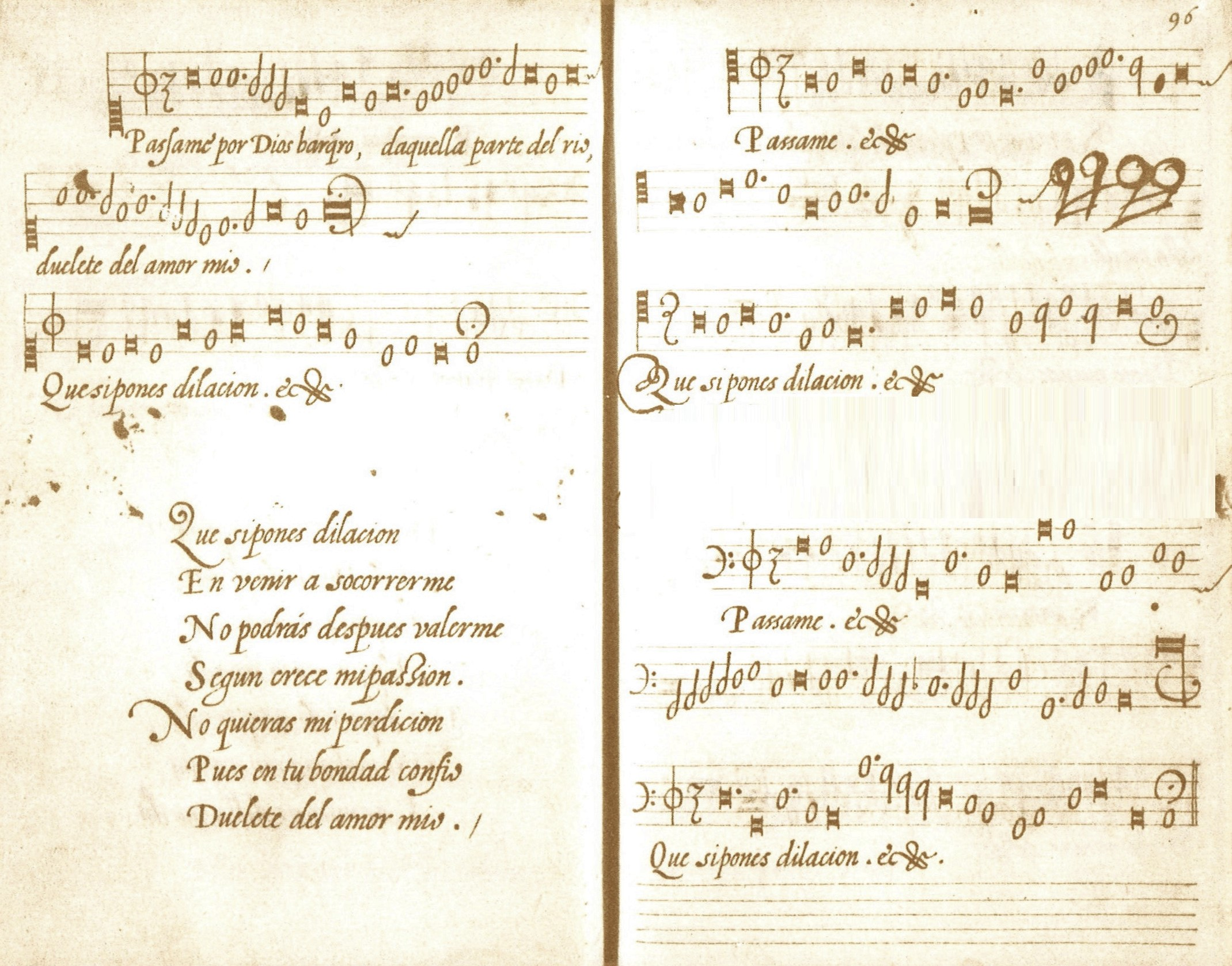
Villancico "Pásame, por Dios, barquero", facsimile from the Elvas Songbook

Two complete masses of Escobar have survived, including a Requiem setting (Missa pro defunctis), the earliest by a composer from the Iberian Peninsula. His known work also includes a setting of the Magnificat, 7 motets (including one Stabat Mater), 4 antiphons, 8 hymns, and 18 villancicos, but it is highly probable that his authorship is hidden among the many anonymous works of the Portuguese and Spanish renaissance manuscripts. His music was popular, as attested by the appearance of copies in far-off places; for example native scribes copied two of his manuscripts in Guatemala. His motet Clamabat autem mulier Cananea was particularly praised by his contemporaries, and served as the source for instrumental pieces by later composers, namely Alonso Mudarra.

== References and further reading ==
- Reese, Gustave (1954). Music in the Renaissance. New York: W.W. Norton & Company. ISBN 0-393-09530-4.
- Stevenson, Robert (1980). "Escobar, Pedro de". In Sadie, Stanley (ed.). The New Grove Dictionary of Music and Musicians. Vol. vi (1st ed.). London: Macmillan. pp. 243–244.
- Stevenson, Robert (24 February 2010) [20 January 2001]. "Escobar, Pedro de". Grove Music Online (8th ed.). Oxford University Press. doi:10.1093/gmo/9781561592630.article.08972. ISBN 978-1-56159-263-0.
