= Secular music =

Music genre

Secular or saecular (Latin saecularis, "of the ages") is a term usually understood as meaning "worldly" or "non-religious", but when contrasted with cloistered monasteries a cathedral is technically a saecular institution with secular clergy. In vocal music of the classical tradition of western music, secular music is distinguished from both liturgical and devotional religious music as the two main genres of Western music during the Middle Ages and Renaissance era. In such a context the oldest written examples of secular music are songs of the goliards with Latin lyrics. These were followed by vernacular chansons de geste (songs of deeds) and were popular amongst the traveling jongleurs and minstrels of the time.

The largest collection of secular music from this period comes from poems of celebration and chivalry of the troubadours from the south of France. These poems contain clever rhyme-schemes, varied use of refrain-lines or words, and different metric patterns. The minstrels of this time were not themselves poets or composers. Instead they adapted the compositions of others to sing, play, and dance to in their own unique versions. Other styles included love songs, political satire, dances, chansons, and dramatic works.

Much non-vocal instrumental music also seems intended for non-religious use. According to Grout's A History of Western Music (1996), common musical instruments of medieval music included: harps, imported to continental Europe from Ireland and Britain sometime before the ninth century; Vielle, a prototype of the Renaissance viol and modern viola with five strings, one of which was a drone, popular amongst the jongleurs to accompany their singing and recitations; Organistrum, a three-stringed instrument similar to the vielle but played by the turning of a crank, with strings ‘stopped by a set rods instead of the player's fingers); and Psaltery, a type of zither played by plucking or ‘striking’ the strings, which frequently appears in medieval art. The most common wind instruments included both recorder and transverse style flutes; the reeded Shawms, a precursor to the oboe; trumpets and bagpipes.

Drums, harps, recorders, and bagpipes were the instruments of choice when performing secular music due to ease of transportation. Jongleurs and minstrels learned their trade through oral tradition.

Josquin des Prez and Guillaume de Machaut may be cited as composers who excelled at both secular and sacred music.

In the Middle Ages, and even through the Renaissance and the Age of Enlightenment, any music that was not commissioned by the Catholic Church (or, later, a Protestant church) for liturgical use was and still is considered "secular music." Symphony No. 9 (Beethoven) (commonly called "Ode to Joy") and Messiah (Handel) are both examples of secular music because, despite being wholly and innately religious in theme, they were not commissioned by any church or for use in any religion's liturgy. Symphony No. 9 was commissioned by the Philharmonic Society of London for theater performance, not by the Catholic Church, the Church of England, or any other church and not for liturgical use. Likewise, "Messiah (Handel) was commissioned by the Duke of Devonshire to be performed in Dublin theaters for a series of charity concerts, not by the Catholic Church or any other church and not for liturgical use. So, while "secular" today is often taken to mean non-religious in any way, when it refers to music from the Middle Ages through as late as the 19th century, music with a religious theme may be and very often is "secular music" for the simple fact that it was not written on behalf of any commissioning church or for liturgical use, meaning "secular" does not indicate that it is thematically non-religious but that it is non-religious vis-à-vis a religious organization (i.e., the Church) did not commission its creation, sacred music being definitively music commissioned by the Church for liturgical use, for use by the Church in the Church's established rituals, the Church's ceremonies, and the Church's forms of worship, and any and all other music (i.e., music not fitting that strict definition) being secular music, no matter how religiously themed or gloriously worshipful of God it may be.

== Bibliography ==
- Grout, Donald J.; Palisca, Claude V. (1996). A history of western music (5th ed.). New York: W. W. Norton & Company.
