= Juan Cornago =

Spanish composer

Juan Cornago (Johannes Cornago) (c. 1400 – after 1475) was a Spanish composer of the early Renaissance. He is the earliest Spanish composer with a large number of surviving works.

== Life ==
Almost nothing is known of Cornago's origins. He may be the Juan Carnago of Calahorra, La Rioja, Spain, who solicited Pope Martin V for prebends in various parishes between 1420 and 1429. It is certain that he is the Cornago, a Franciscan, who graduated from the University of Paris in 1449. Then from 1453 he was in Naples serving in the royal chapel of Alfonso V of Aragon, where Pope Calixtus III issued him a bull in order to officially recognize him as Alfonso's chaplain. Cornago was so famed that he received a very high yearly salary of 300 ducats, more than even Josquin des Prez at the height of his career. After the death of Alfonso in 1466 he continued to serve as chief almoner in the chapel under Alfonso's son, Fernando I of Naples. Cornago was the leading songwriter at the Aragonese court in Naples. Later in 1475 he transferred to the chapel of Fernando the Catholic in Spain, where he is last recorded singing in the court.

== Music ==
One of his most popular surviving compositions, Missa 'Ayo visto lo mappamundi', was based on a popular Sicilian song in barzelletta form. It is one of the earliest surviving masses that is based on a secular cantus firmus, which was quite rare at the time. The mass reflects the English mass, which he likely learned about during his studies in Paris. It features duets at the beginnings of movements, a head motive, asymmetrical phrases, repetitive rhythmic patterns, and colorful harmonic progressions. It was written in 1452 for the coronation the marriage of Holy Roman Emperor Frederick III and Leonora of Portugal, and a superscript associates the mass with the Virgin Mary.

His Spanish songs are some of the earliest polyphonic canciones written in Castilian. He sourced the poetry from famed Castilian poets, such as Marqués de Santillana, Juan de Mena, and Pedro de Torellas. Five of his nine surviving Spanish songs feature text written by known poets. Morte o merce, one of his Italian songs from his time in Fernando I's court, is through-composed and representative of the humanist movement which emphasized words over music. This can be seen in its simple musical style and treatment of the text.

Much of Cornago's music was arranged and altered by other composers of the time. For instance, Johannes Ockeghem added two voices to his Qu'es mi vida preguntays. There are many alternative versions of his music that showcase its improvisatory and adaptable nature, similar to the compositions of many Renaissance composers.

== Works ==
15 compositions survive.

- 4 in Latin
- 8 in Spanish
- 3 in Italian

=== Songs ===
- Doncella non me culpeis
- Donde stas que non te veo
- Gentil dama non se gana
- Infante no es nascido
- More perche non dai fede
- Morte mercé gentile aquil'altera
- Non gusto del male estranio
- Porque mas sin duda creas
- Pues que Dios te fizo tal
- Qu'es mi vida preguntays
- Segun las penas me days
- Señora qual soy venido
- Yerra con poco saber

=== Motets ===
- Patres nostri peccaverunt

=== Masses ===
- Ayo visto lo mappamundi

== Recordings ==
For fuller information see the extensive discography on Spanish Wikipedia.

- Misa de la mapa mundi, His Majestie's Clerkes dir Paul Hillier, Harmonia Mundi
- Columbus Paraisos Perdidos Jordi Savall. 2SACD AliaVox
- Isabel I – Reina de Castilla 1451–1504. Jordi Savall. AliaVox
- Alfons V. el Magnanim – El Cancionero de Montecassino. Jordi Savall. 2CD AliaVox
- O Tempo Bono. Music at the Aragonese Court of Naples. Florilegio Ensemble. Marcello Serafini. Symphonia 00180.
- Ars Moriendi. Huelgas Ensemble, dir. Paul Van Nevel. Alpha LP.
- Moro perchè non-day fede. on Fantasiant, música i poesia per a Ausiàs March Capella de Ministrers, dir. Carles Magraner.
