= Ancient Corinth =

Ancient city-state in mainland Greece

Corinth Κόρινθος Ϙόρινθος
- 900 BC–146 BC
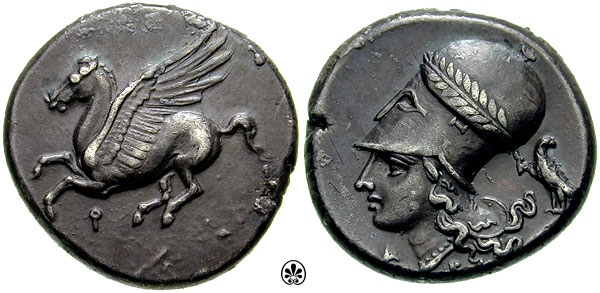
- Silver tridrachm from Corinth, c. 345–307 BC

- Map of ancient Corinth
- Capital: Corinth
- Common languages: Doric Greek
- Religion: Greek polytheism
- Government: Oligarchy
- Historical era: Classical Antiquity
  - Founding: 900 BC
  - Cypselus: 657–627 BC
  - Captured and razed by Romans: 146 BC
Preceded by	Succeeded by
Greek Dark Ages	Roman Republic

Corinth (/ˈkɒrɪnθ/ KORR-inth; Ancient Greek: Κόρινθος Kórinthos; Doric Greek: Ϙόρινθος Qórinthos; Latin: Corinthus) was a city-state (polis) on the Isthmus of Corinth, the narrow stretch of land that joins the Peloponnese peninsula to mainland Greece, roughly halfway between Athens and Sparta. The modern city of Corinth is located approximately 5 kilometres (3.1 mi) northeast of the ancient ruins. Since 1896, systematic archaeological investigations of the Corinth Excavations by the American School of Classical Studies at Athens have revealed large parts of the ancient city, and recent excavations conducted by the Greek Ministry of Culture have brought to light important new facets of antiquity.

For Christians, Corinth is well known from the two letters from Paul the Apostle in the New Testament, the First Epistle to the Corinthians and the Second Epistle to the Corinthians. Corinth is also mentioned in the Acts of the Apostles as part of Paul the Apostle's missionary travels. In addition, the second book of Pausanias' Description of Greece is devoted to Corinth.

Ancient Corinth was one of the largest and most important cities of Greece, with a population of 90,000 in 400 BC. The Romans demolished Corinth in 146 BC after they captured it as result of the Battle of Corinth, built a new city in its place in 44 BC, and later made it the provincial capital of Achaea.

== History ==
=== Geographical setting and topography ===
The geophysical situation at Corinth is in many ways ideal for human habitation. The city is situated on two large geomorphic terraces, at the southern edge of which is located both arable plains and a number of natural springs. These abundant sources of fresh water are further supplemented by seasonal rivers descending from the Ayios Vasilios valley and Mount Ziria. Natural drainage patterns in the region have formed a broad valley, enabling the movement of wheeled and pedestrian traffic between the terraces.

The geological makeup of Corinth provided the basic materials for the city's construction. The oolitic limestone of the region’s marine sand bars was used extensively in both domestic and public architecture, and local Corinthian stone was quarried extensively and traded widely across the Aegean. Supplementing this resource are abundant local deposits of calcareous marl, which served as a rich source for the production of ceramics. These marls, when dug, dried, powdered, heated, and mixed with water, made for a highly workable clay, excellent for the production of lightweight ceramic vessels. Pottery created from Corinthian limestone concrete was exported widely in various periods.

=== Prehistory and founding myths ===
Neolithic pottery suggests that the site of Corinth was occupied from at least as early as 6500 BC, and continually occupied into the Early Bronze Age, when, it has been suggested, the settlement acted as a centre of trade. However, there is a huge drop in ceramic remains during the Early Helladic II phase and only sparse ceramic remains in the EHIII and MH phases; thus, it appears that the area was very sparsely inhabited in the period immediately before the Mycenaean period. There was a settlement on the coast near Lechaion which traded across the Corinthian Gulf; the site of Corinth itself was likely not heavily occupied again until around 900 BC, when it is believed that the Dorians settled there. The Early Helladic II and Early Helladic III eras are listed above.

According to Corinthian myth as reported by Pausanias, the city was founded by Corinthos, a descendant of the god Zeus. However, other myths hold that it was founded by the goddess Ephyra, a daughter of the Titan Oceanus, thus the ancient name of the city (also Ephyra).

It seems likely that Corinth was also the site of a Bronze Age Mycenaean palace-city, like Mycenae, Tiryns, or Pylos. According to myth, Sisyphus was the founder of a race of ancient kings at Corinth. It was also in Corinth that Jason, the leader of the Argonauts, abandoned Medea. The Catalogue of Ships in the Iliad lists the Corinthians amid the contingent fighting in the Trojan War under the leadership of Agamemnon.

In a Corinthian myth recounted to Pausanias in the 2nd century AD, Briareus, one of the Hecatonchires, was the arbitrator in a dispute between Poseidon and Helios, respectively gods of the sea and the sun. His verdict was that the Isthmus of Corinth, the area closest to the sea, belonged to Poseidon, and the acropolis of Corinth (Acrocorinth), closest to the sky, belonged to Helios.

The Upper Peirene spring is located within the walls of the acropolis. Pausanias (2.5.1) says that it was put there by Asopus, repaying Sisyphus for information about the abduction of Aegina by Zeus. According to legend, the winged horse Pegasus drank at the spring, and was captured and tamed by the Corinthian hero Bellerophon.

=== Corinth under the Bacchiadae ===
Corinth had been a backwater in Greece in the 8th century BC. The Bacchiadae (Βακχιάδαι, Bakkhiádai) were a tightly-knit Doric clan and the ruling kinship group of archaic Corinth in the 8th and 7th centuries BC, a period of expanding Corinthian cultural power. In 747 BC (a traditional date), an aristocracy ousted the Bacchiadai Prytaneis and reinstituted the kingship, about the time the Kingdom of Lydia (the endonymic Basileia Sfard) was at its greatest, coinciding with the ascent of Basileus Meles, King of Lydia. The Bacchiadae, numbering perhaps a couple of hundred adult males, took power from the last king Telestes (from the House of Sisyphos) in Corinth. The Bacchiads dispensed with kingship and ruled as a group, governing the city by annually electing a prytanis (who held the kingly position for his brief term), probably a council (though none is specifically documented in the scant literary materials), and a polemarchos to head the army.

During Bacchiad rule from 747 to 650 BC, Corinth became a unified state. Large scale public buildings and monuments were constructed at this time. In 733 BC, Corinth established colonies at Corcyra and Syracuse. By 730 BC, Corinth emerged as a highly advanced Greek city with at least 5,000 people.

Aristotle tells the story of Philolaus of Corinth, a Bacchiad who was a lawgiver at Thebes. He became the lover of Diocles, the winner of the Olympic games. They both lived for the rest of their lives in Thebes. Their tombs were built near one another and Philolaus' tomb points toward the Corinthian country, while Diocles' faces away.

In 657 BC, polemarch Cypselus obtained an oracle from Delphi which he interpreted to mean that he should rule the city. He seized power and exiled the Bacchiadae.

=== Corinth under the tyrants ===
Cypselus (Κύψελος, Kýpselos) was the first tyrant of Corinth in the 7th century BC. From 658–628 BC, he removed the Bacchiad aristocracy from power and ruled for three decades. He built temples to Apollo and Poseidon in 650 BC.

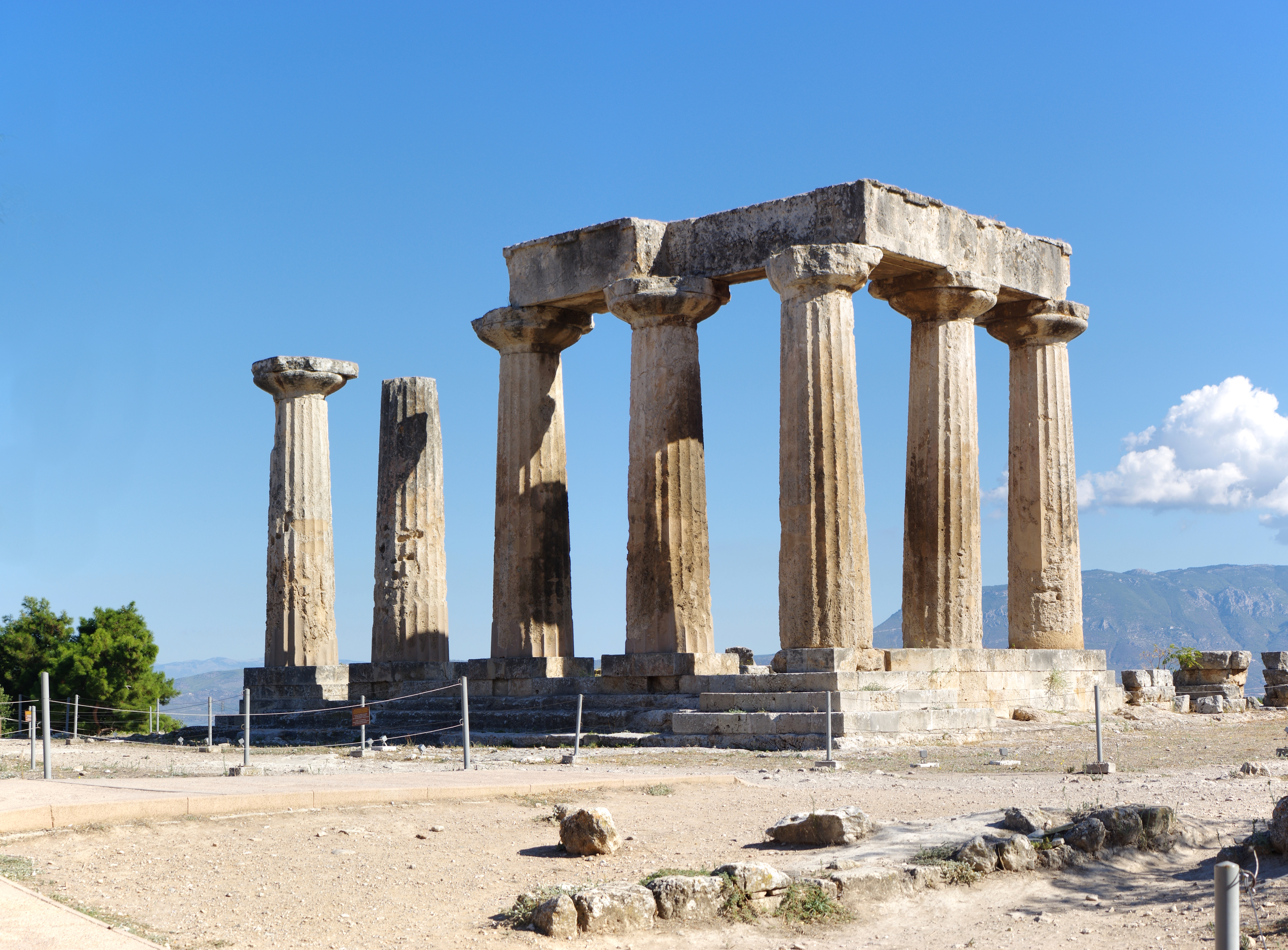
The Temple of Apollo was built in the Doric order on the ruins of earlier temple, being a good example of peripteral temple, supported by 38 columns, 7 of which are still in place.

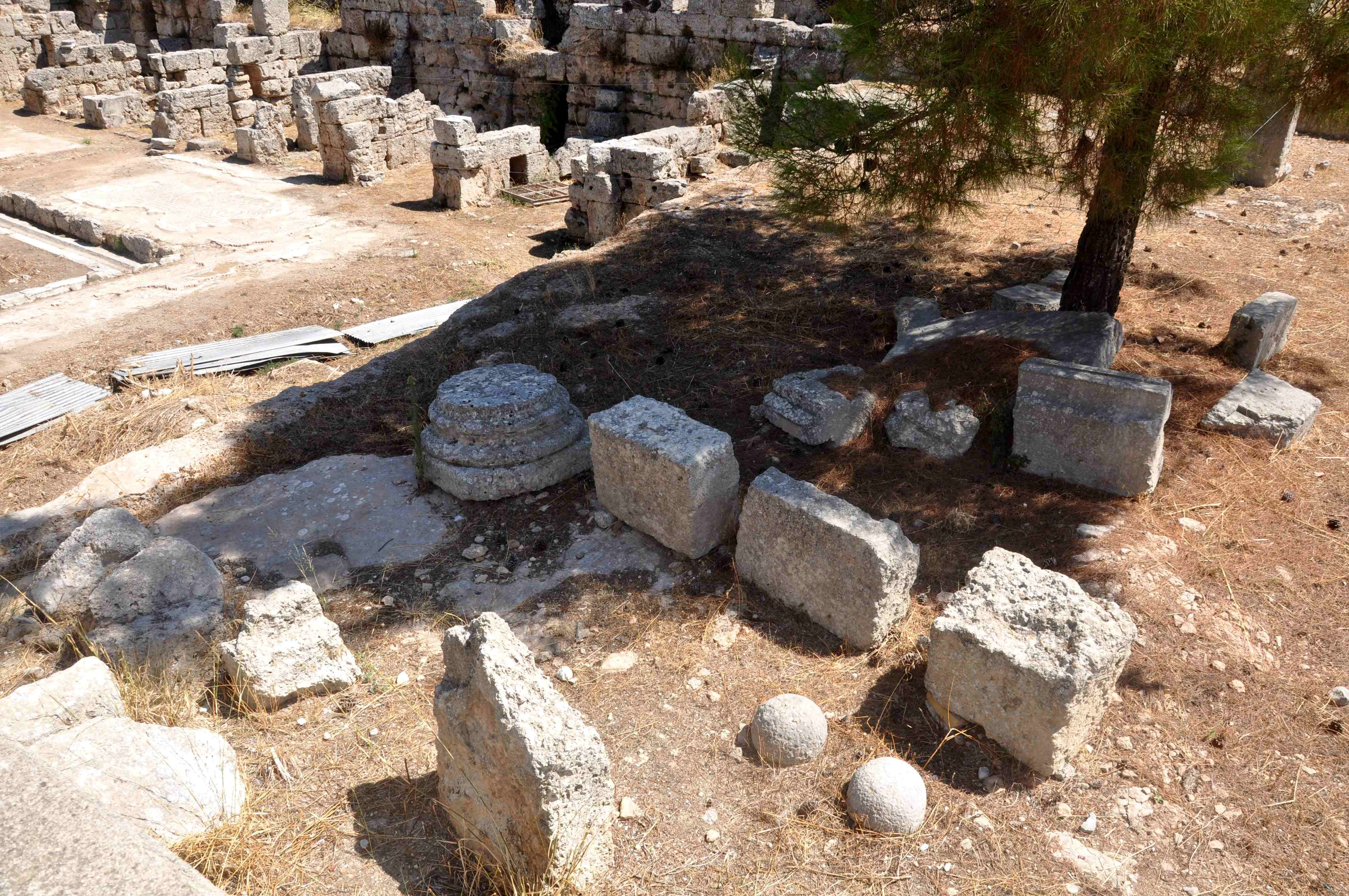
The archeological site located close to Temple of Apollo.

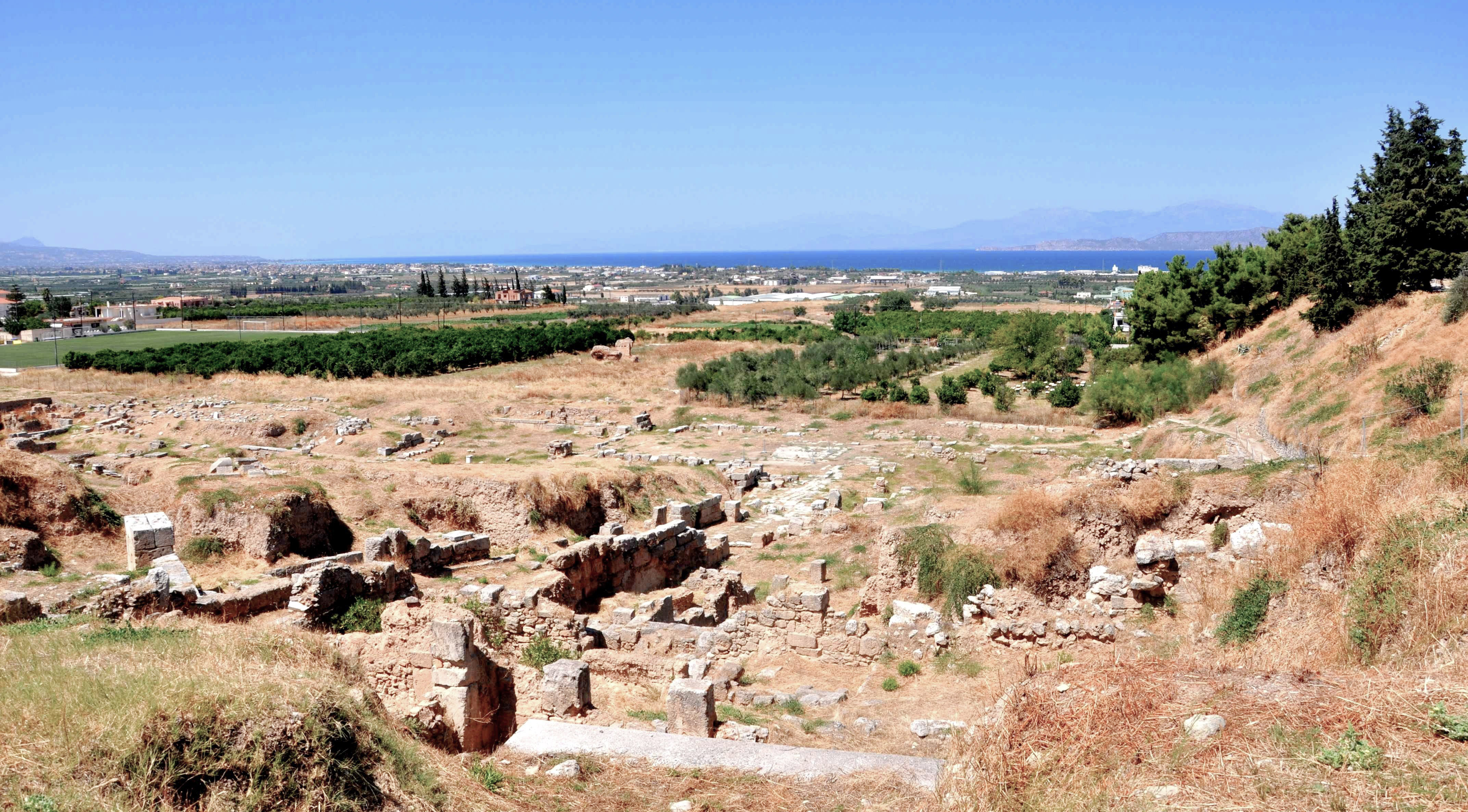
The archeological site of Ancient Theater first built in Corinth in 5th c. BC. The Theater could seat around 15,000 spectators.

Cypselus was the son of Eëtion and a disfigured woman named Labda. He was a member of the Bacchiad kin and usurped the power in archaic matriarchal right of his mother. According to Herodotus, the Bacchiadae heard two prophecies from the Delphic oracle that the son of Eëtion would overthrow their dynasty, and they planned to kill the baby once he was born. However, the newborn smiled at each of the men sent to kill him, and none of them could bear to strike the blow.

Labda then hid the baby in a chest, and the men could not find him once they had composed themselves and returned to kill him. (Compare the infancy of Perseus.) The ivory chest of Cypselus was richly worked and adorned with gold. It was a votive offering at Olympia, where Pausanias gave it a minute description in his 2nd century AD travel guide.

Cypselus grew up and fulfilled the prophecy. Corinth had been involved in wars with Argos and Corcyra, and the Corinthians were unhappy with their rulers. Cypselus was polemarch at the time (around 657 BC), the archon in charge of the military, and he used his influence with the soldiers to expel the king. He also expelled his other enemies, but allowed them to set up colonies in northwestern Greece.

He also increased trade with the colonies in Italy and Sicily. He was a popular ruler and, unlike many later tyrants, he did not need a bodyguard and died a natural death. Aristotle reports that "Cypselus of Corinth had made a vow that if he became master of the city, he would offer to Zeus the entire property of the Corinthians. Accordingly, he commanded them to make a return of their possessions."

The city sent forth colonists to found new settlements in the 7th century BC, under the rule of Cypselus (r. 657–627 BC) and his son Periander (r. 627–587 BC). Those settlements were Epidamnus (modern day Durrës, Albania), Syracuse, Ambracia, Corcyra (modern day town of Corfu), and Anactorium. Periander also founded Apollonia in Illyria (modern day Fier, Albania) and Potidaea (in Chalcidice). Corinth was also one of the nine Greek sponsor-cities to found the colony of Naukratis in Ancient Egypt, founded to accommodate the increasing trade volume between the Greek world and pharaonic Egypt during the reign of Pharaoh Psammetichus I of the 26th Dynasty.

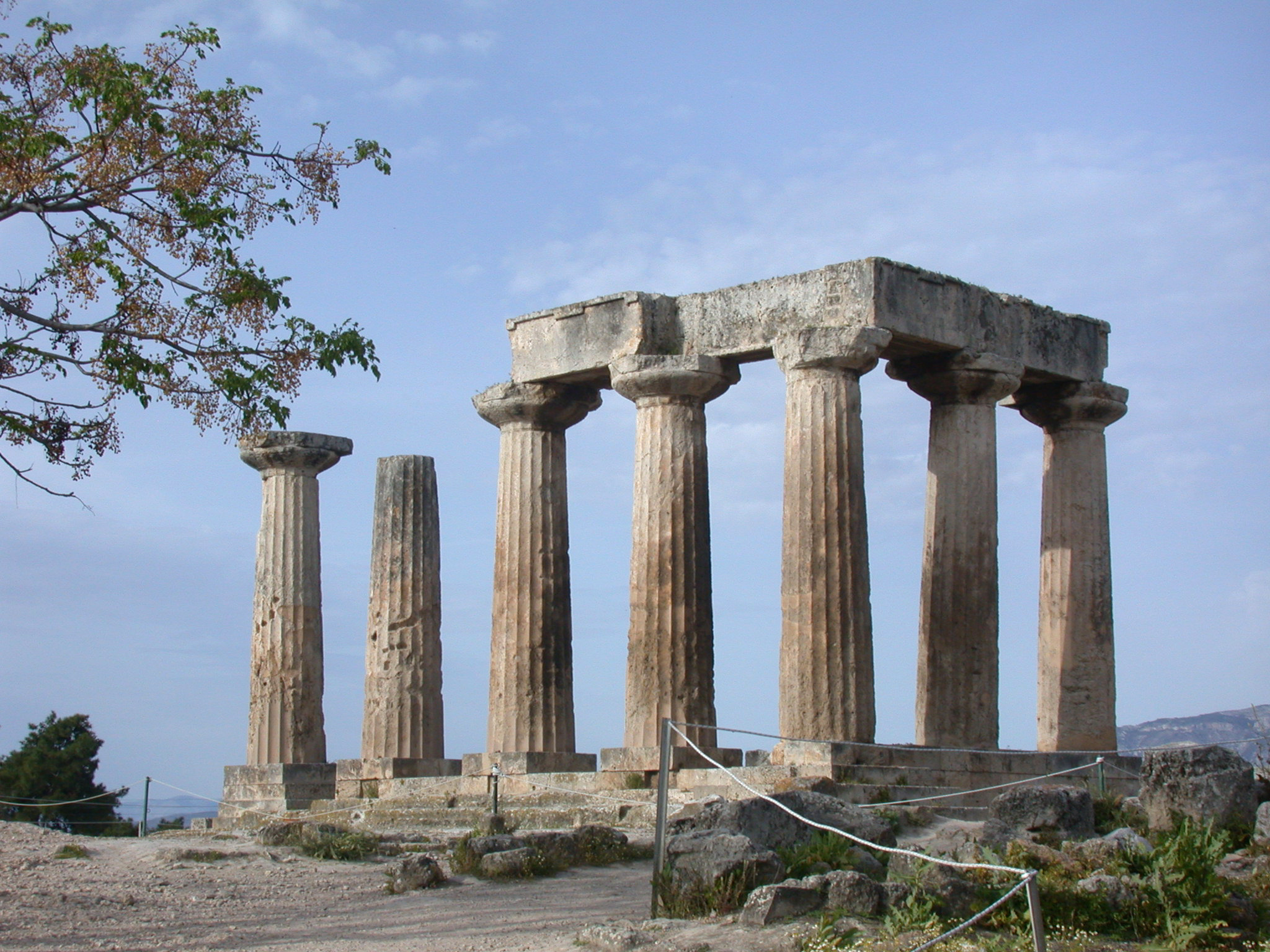
Temple of Apollo, Ancient Corinth

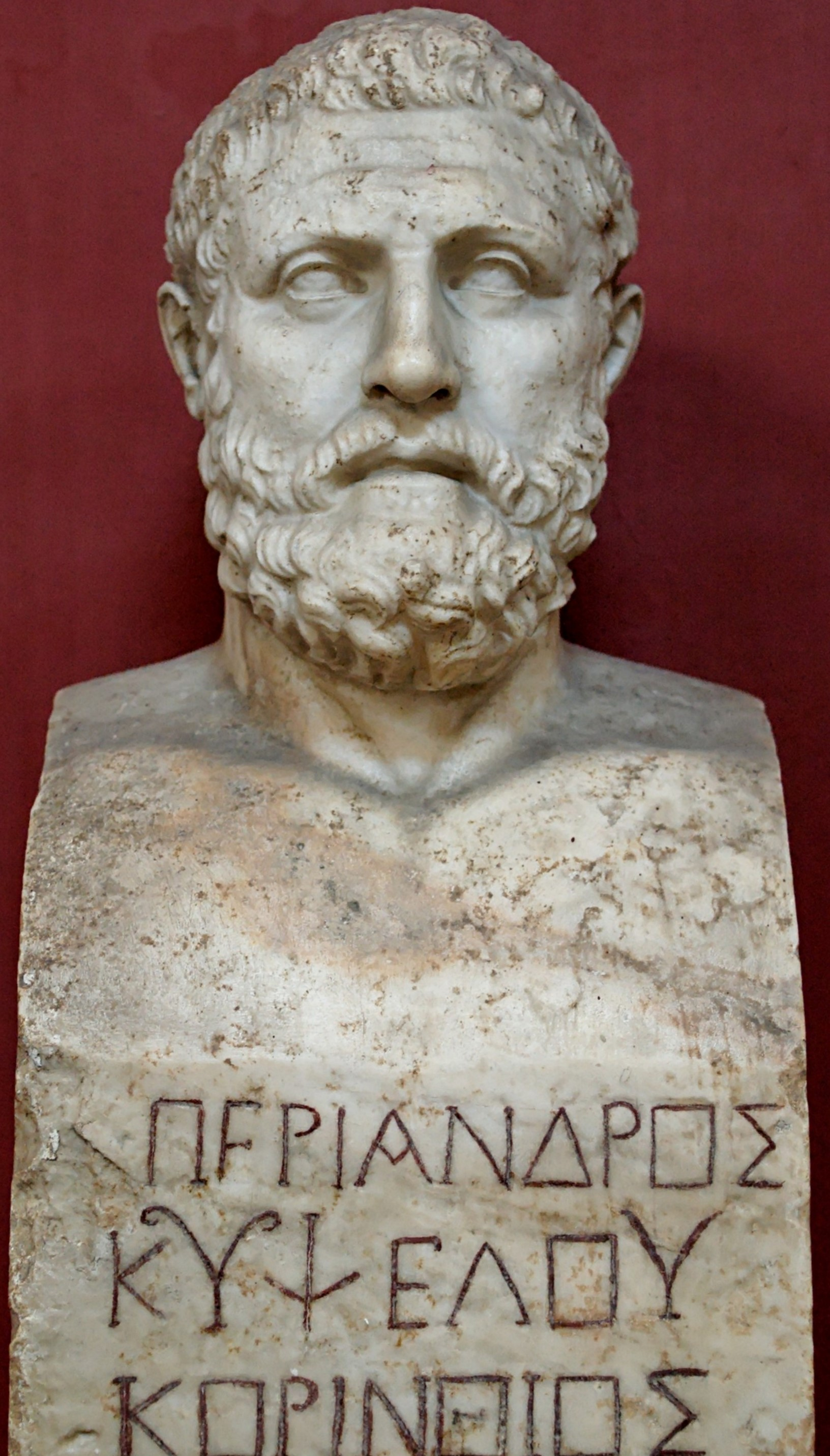
Periander (Περίανδρος, Períandros, r. 627–587 BC)

He ruled for thirty years and was succeeded as tyrant by his son Periander in 627 BC. The treasury that Cypselus built at Delphi was apparently still standing in the time of Herodotus, and the chest of Cypselus was seen by Pausanias at Olympia in the 2nd century AD. Periander brought Corcyra to order in 600 BC.

Periander was considered one of the Seven Wise Men of Greece. During his reign, the first Corinthian coins were struck. He was the first to attempt to cut across the Isthmus to create a seaway between the Corinthian and the Saronic Gulfs. He abandoned the venture due to the extreme technical difficulties that he met, but he created the Diolkos instead (a stone-built overland ramp). The era of the Cypselids was Corinth's golden age, and ended with Periander's nephew Psammetichus (Corinthian tyrant), named after the hellenophile Egyptian Pharaoh Psammetichus I (see above).

Periander killed his wife Melissa. His son Lycophron found out and shunned him, and Periander exiled the son to Corcyra. Periander later wanted Lycophron to replace him as ruler of Corinth, and convinced him to come home to Corinth on the condition that Periander go to Corcyra. The Corcyreans heard about this and killed Lycophron to keep away Periander.

=== Corinth after the tyrants ===
581 BC: Periander's nephew and successor was assassinated, ending the tyranny.

581 BC: the Isthmian Games were established by leading families.

570 BC: the inhabitants started to use silver coins called 'colts' or 'foals'.

550 BC: Construction of the Temple of Apollo at Corinth (early third quarter of the 6th century BC).

550 BC: Corinth allied with Sparta.

525 BC: Corinth formed a conciliatory alliance with Sparta against Argos.

519 BC: Corinth mediated between Athens and Thebes.

Around 500 BC: Athenians and Corinthians entreated Spartans not to harm Athens by restoring the tyrant.

Just before the classical period, according to Thucydides, the Corinthians developed the trireme which became the standard warship of the Mediterranean until the late Roman period. Corinth fought the first naval battle on record against the Hellenic city of Corcyra. The Corinthians were also known for their wealth due to their strategic location on the isthmus, through which all land traffic had to pass en route to the Peloponnese, including messengers and traders.

=== Classical Corinth ===
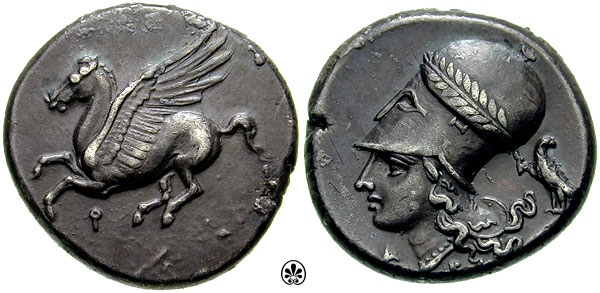
Corinthian stater. Obverse: Pegasus with the archaic letter koppa (Ϙ) beneath the breast. Reverse: Athena wearing Corinthian helmet. Koppa originally stood for Ϙόρινθος (Qórinthos), the earliest spelling of the city's name in Doric Greek, but came to symbolize Corinth during the Classical period, as it had otherwise fallen out of use in favour of kappa (Κ) by the 5th century B.C.

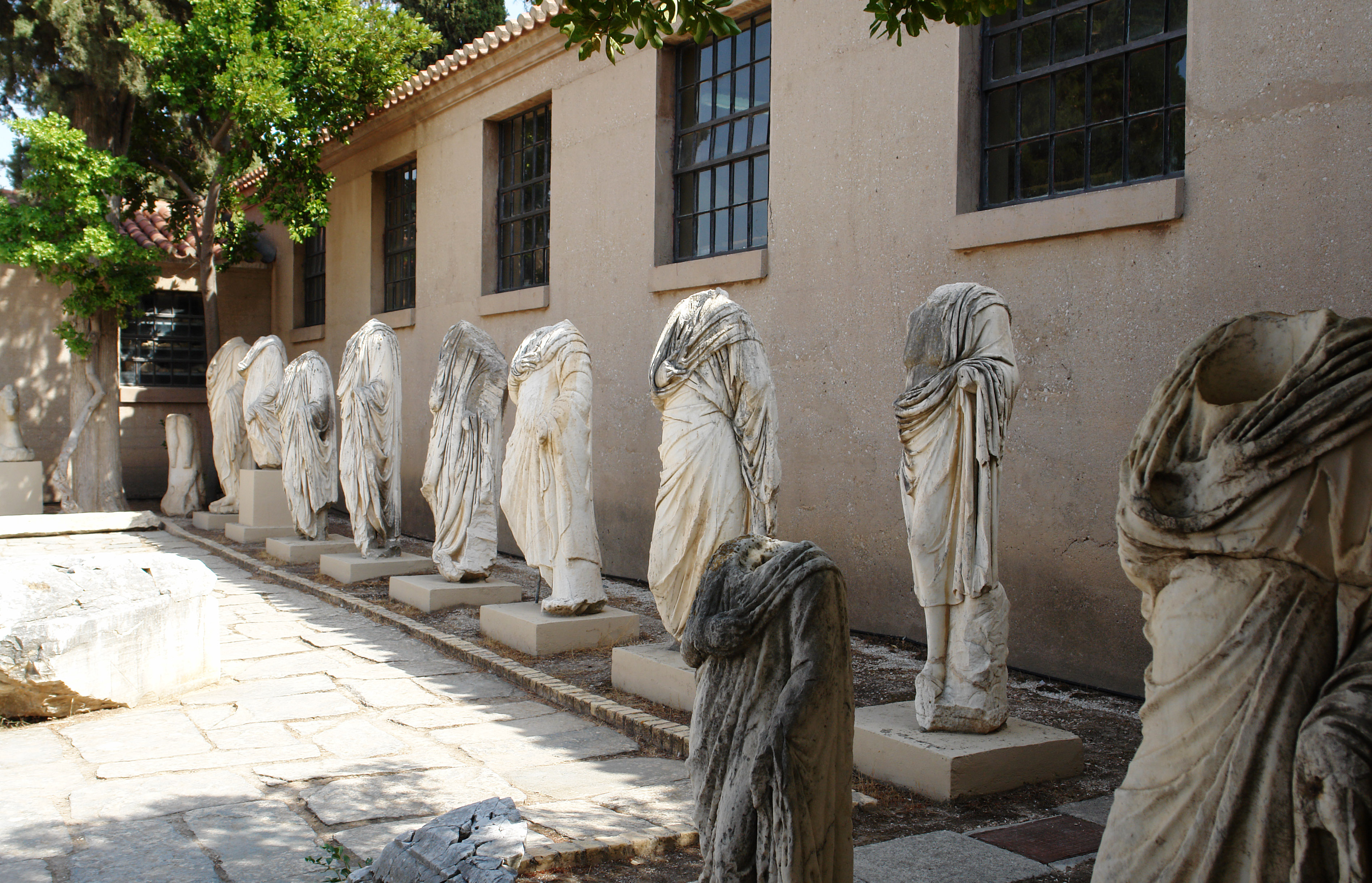
Statues in the Archaeological Museum of Ancient Corinth

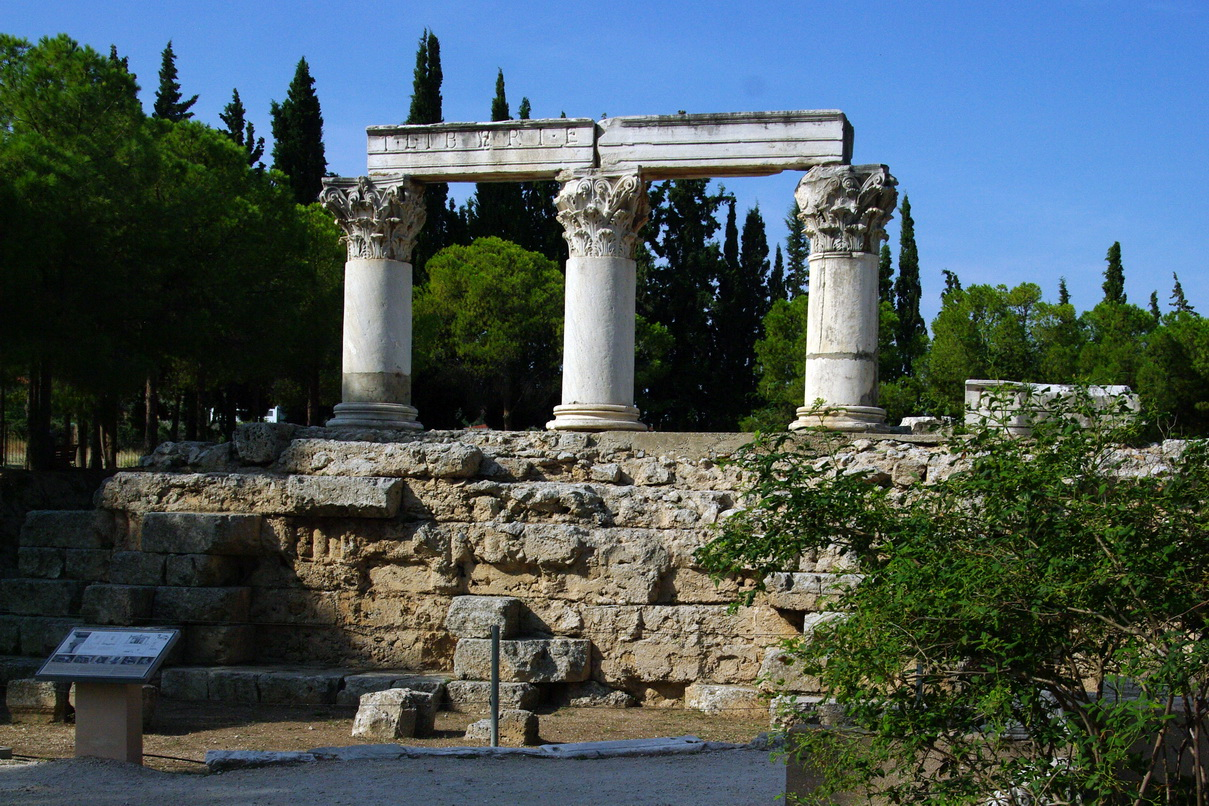
Corinthian order columns in ancient Corinth

In classical times, Corinth rivaled Athens and Thebes in wealth, based on the Isthmian traffic and trade. Until the mid-6th century, Corinth was a major exporter of black-figure pottery to city-states around the Greek world, later losing their market to Athenian artisans.

In classical times and earlier, Corinth had a temple of Aphrodite, the goddess of love, employing some thousand hetairas (temple prostitutes) (see also Temple prostitution in Corinth). The city was renowned for these temple prostitutes, who served the wealthy merchants and the powerful officials who frequented the city. Lais, the most famous hetaira, was said to charge tremendous fees for her extraordinary favours. Referring to the city's exorbitant luxuries, Horace is quoted as saying: "non licet omnibus adire Corinthum" ("not everyone is able to go to Corinth").

Corinth was also the host of the Isthmian Games. During this era, Corinthians developed the Corinthian order, the third main style of classical architecture after the Doric and the Ionic. The Corinthian order was the most complicated of the three, showing the city's wealth and the luxurious lifestyle, while the Doric order evoked the rigorous simplicity of the Spartans, and the Ionic was a harmonious balance between these two following the cosmopolitan philosophy of Ionians like the Athenians.

The city had two main ports: to the west on the Corinthian Gulf lay Lechaion, which connected the city to its western colonies (Greek: apoikiai) and Magna Graecia, while to the east on the Saronic Gulf the port of Kenchreai served the ships coming from Athens, Ionia, Cyprus and the Levant. Both ports had docks for the city's large navy.

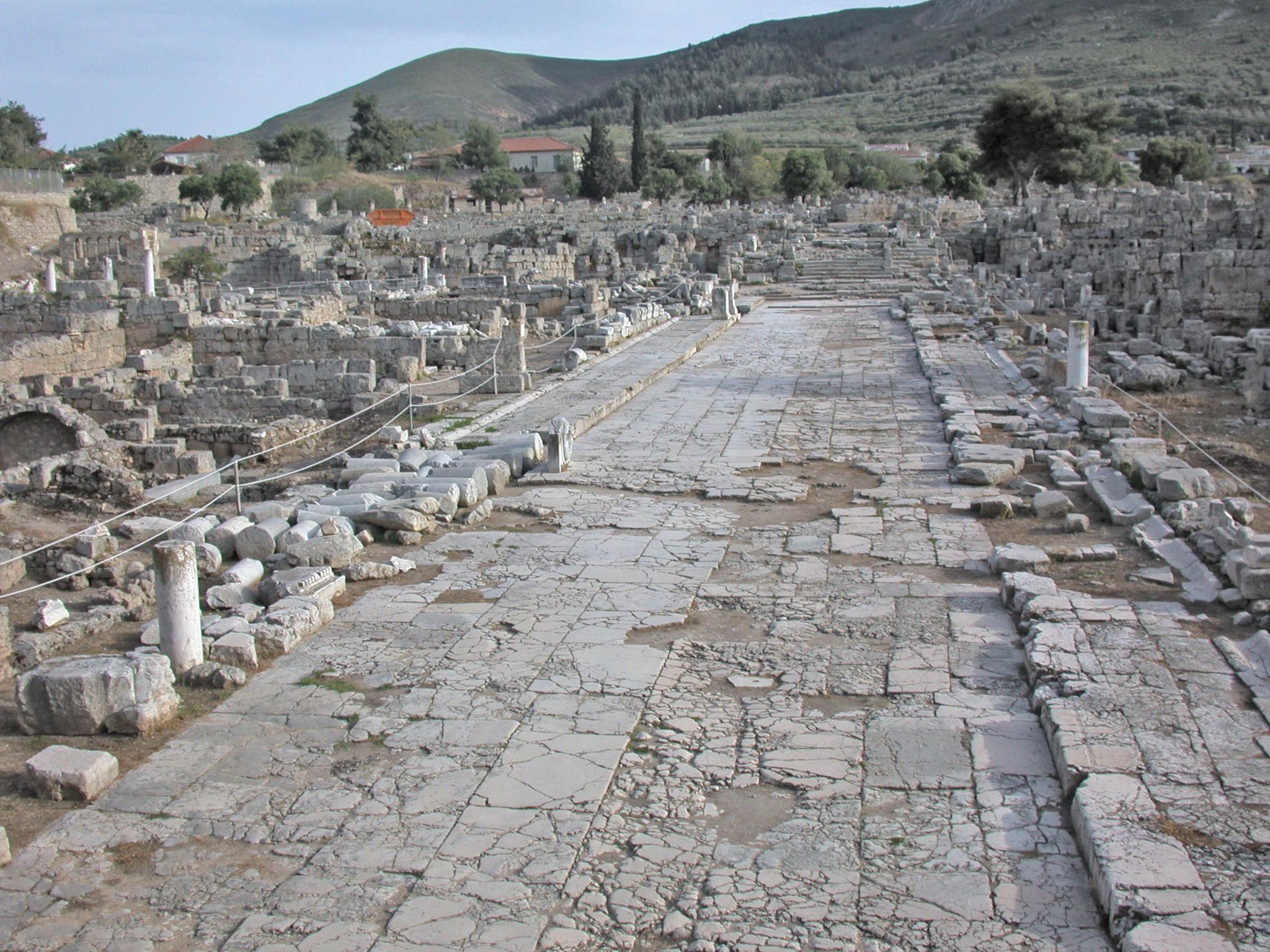
Street in ancient Corinth

In 491 BC, Corinth mediated between Syracuse and Gela in Sicily.

During the years 481–480 BC, the Conference at the Isthmus of Corinth (following conferences at Sparta) established the Hellenic League, which allied under the Spartans to fight the war against Persia. The city was a major participant in the Persian Wars, sending 400 soldiers to defend Thermopylae and supplying forty warships for the Battle of Salamis under Adeimantos and 5,000 hoplites with their characteristic Corinthian helmets) in the following Battle of Plataea. The Greeks obtained the surrender of Theban collaborators with the Persians. Pausanias took them to Corinth where they were put to death.

Following the Battle of Thermopylae and the subsequent Battle of Artemisium, which resulted in the captures of Euboea, Boeotia, and Attica, the Greco-Persian Wars were at a point where now most of mainland Greece to the north of the Isthmus of Corinth had been overrun.

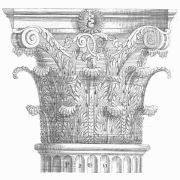
Corinthian order

Herodotus, who was believed to dislike the Corinthians, mentions that they were considered the second best fighters after the Athenians.

In 458 BC, Corinth was defeated by Athens at Megara.

==== Peloponnesian War ====
In 435 BC, Corinth and its colony Corcyra went to war over Epidamnus. In 433 BC, Athens allied with Corcyra against Corinth. The Corinthian war against the Corcyrans was the largest naval battle between Greek city states until that time. In 431 BC, one of the factors leading to the Peloponnesian War was the dispute between Corinth and Athens over Corcyra, which possibly stemmed from the traditional trade rivalry between the two cities or, as Thucydides relates – the dispute over the colony of Epidamnus.

The Syracusans sent envoys to Corinth and Sparta to seek allies against Athenian invasion. The Corinthians "voted at once to aid [the Syracusans] heart and soul". The Corinthians also sent a group to Lacedaemon to rouse Spartan assistance. After a convincing speech from the Athenian renegade Alcibiades, the Spartans agreed to send troops to aid the Sicilians.

In 404 BC, Sparta refused to destroy Athens, angering the Corinthians. Corinth joined Argos, Boeotia, and Athens against Sparta in the Corinthian War.

Demosthenes later used this history in a plea for magnanimous statecraft, noting that the Athenians of yesteryear had had good reason to hate the Corinthians and Thebans for their conduct during the Peloponnesian War, yet they bore no malice whatever.

==== Corinthian War ====
In 395 BC, after the end of the Peloponnesian War, Corinth and Thebes, dissatisfied with the hegemony of their Spartan allies, moved to support Athens against Sparta in the Corinthian War.

As an example of facing danger with knowledge, Aristotle used the example of the Argives who were forced to confront the Spartans in the battle at the Long Walls of Corinth in 392 BC.

==== 379–323 BC ====
In 379 BC, Corinth, switching back to the Peloponnesian League, joined Sparta in an attempt to defeat Thebes and eventually take over Athens.

In 366 BC, the Athenian Assembly ordered Chares to occupy the Athenian ally and install a democratic government. This failed when Corinth, Phlius and Epidaurus allied with Boeotia.

Demosthenes recounts how Athens had fought the Spartans in a great battle near Corinth. The city decided not to harbor the defeated Athenian troops, but instead sent heralds to the Spartans. But the Corinthian heralds opened their gates to the defeated Athenians and saved them. Demosthenes notes that they “chose along with you, who had been engaged in battle, to suffer whatever might betide, rather than without you to enjoy a safety that involved no danger.” These conflicts further weakened the city-states of the Peloponnese and set the stage for the conquests of Philip II of Macedon.

Demosthenes warned that Philip's military force exceeded that of Athens and thus they must develop a tactical advantage. He noted the importance of a citizen army as opposed to a mercenary force, citing the mercenaries of Corinth who fought alongside citizens and defeated the Spartans.

In 338 BC, after having defeated Athens and its allies, Philip II created the League of Corinth to unite Greece (included Corinth and Macedonia) in the war against Persia. Philip was named hegemon of the League. In the spring of 337 BC, the Second congress of Corinth established the Common Peace.

=== Hellenistic period ===
By 332 BC, Alexander the Great was in control of Greece, as hegemon.

During the Hellenistic period, Corinth, like many other Greece cities, never quite had autonomy. Under the successors of Alexander the Great, Greece was contested ground, and Corinth was occasionally the battleground for contests between the Antigonids, based in Macedonia, and other Hellenistic powers. In 308 BC, the city was captured from the Antigonids by Ptolemy I, who claimed to come as a liberator of Greece from the Antigonids. However, the city was recaptured by Demetrius in 304 BC.

Corinth remained under Antigonid control for half a century. After 280 BC, it was ruled by the faithful governor Craterus; but, in 253/2 BC, his son Alexander of Corinth, moved by Ptolemaic subsidies, resolved to challenge the Macedonian supremacy and seek independence as a tyrant. He was probably poisoned in 247 BC; after his death, the Macedonian king Antigonus II Gonatas retook the city in the winter of 245/44 BC.

The Macedonian rule was short-lived. In 243 BC, Aratus of Sicyon, using a surprise attack, captured the fortress of Acrocorinth and convinced the citizenship to join the Achaean League.

Thanks to an alliance agreement with Aratus, the Macedonians recovered Corinth once again in 224 BC; but, after the Roman intervention in 197 BC, the city was permanently brought into the Achaean League. Under the leadership of Philopoemen, the Achaeans went on to take control of the entire Peloponnesus and made Corinth the capital of their confederation.

=== Classical Roman era ===
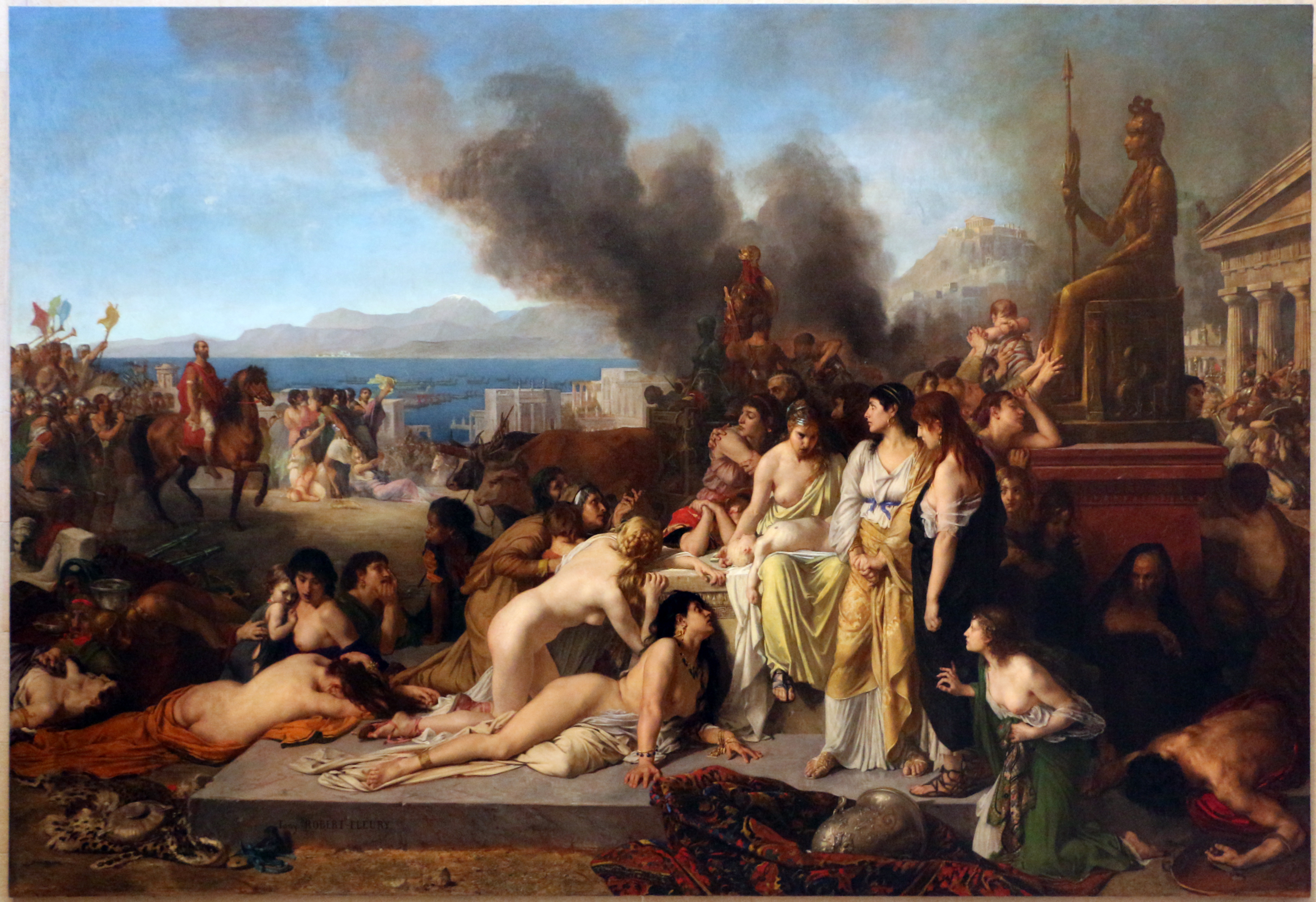
The Last Day of Corinth, by Tony Robert-Fleury. 19th-century depiction of the Roman sack of the city

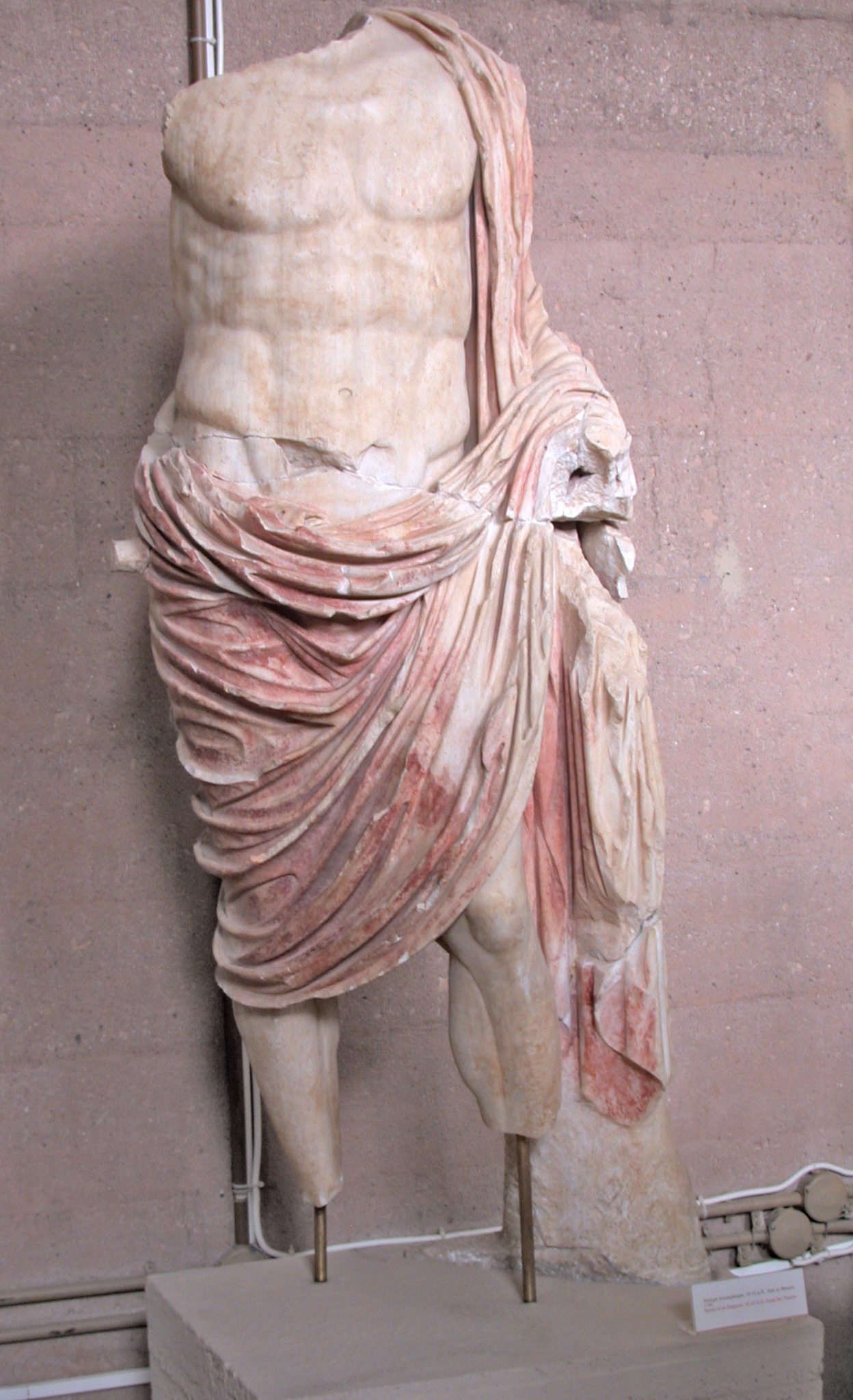
Ancient Roman statue in the Archaeological Museum of Ancient Corinth

==== Roman occupation and development ====
In 146 BC, Rome declared war on the Achaean League. A series of Roman victories culminated in the Battle of Corinth, after which the army of Lucius Mummius besieged, captured, and burned the city. Mummius killed all the men and sold the women and children into slavery; he was subsequently given the cognomen Achaicus as the conqueror of the Achaean League. There is archeological evidence of some minimal habitation in the years afterwards, but Corinth remained largely deserted until Julius Caesar refounded the city as Colonia Laus Iulia Corinthiensis ("colony of Corinth in honour of Julius") in 44 BC, shortly before his assassination. At this time, an amphitheatre was built (37.909824°N 22.892078°E).

Under the Romans, Corinth was rebuilt as a major city in Southern Greece or Achaia. It had a large mixed population of Romans, Greeks, and Jews. The city was an important locus for activities of The Roman Imperial Cult, and both Temple E and the Julian Basilica have been suggested as locations of imperial cult activity.

==== New Testament Corinth ====
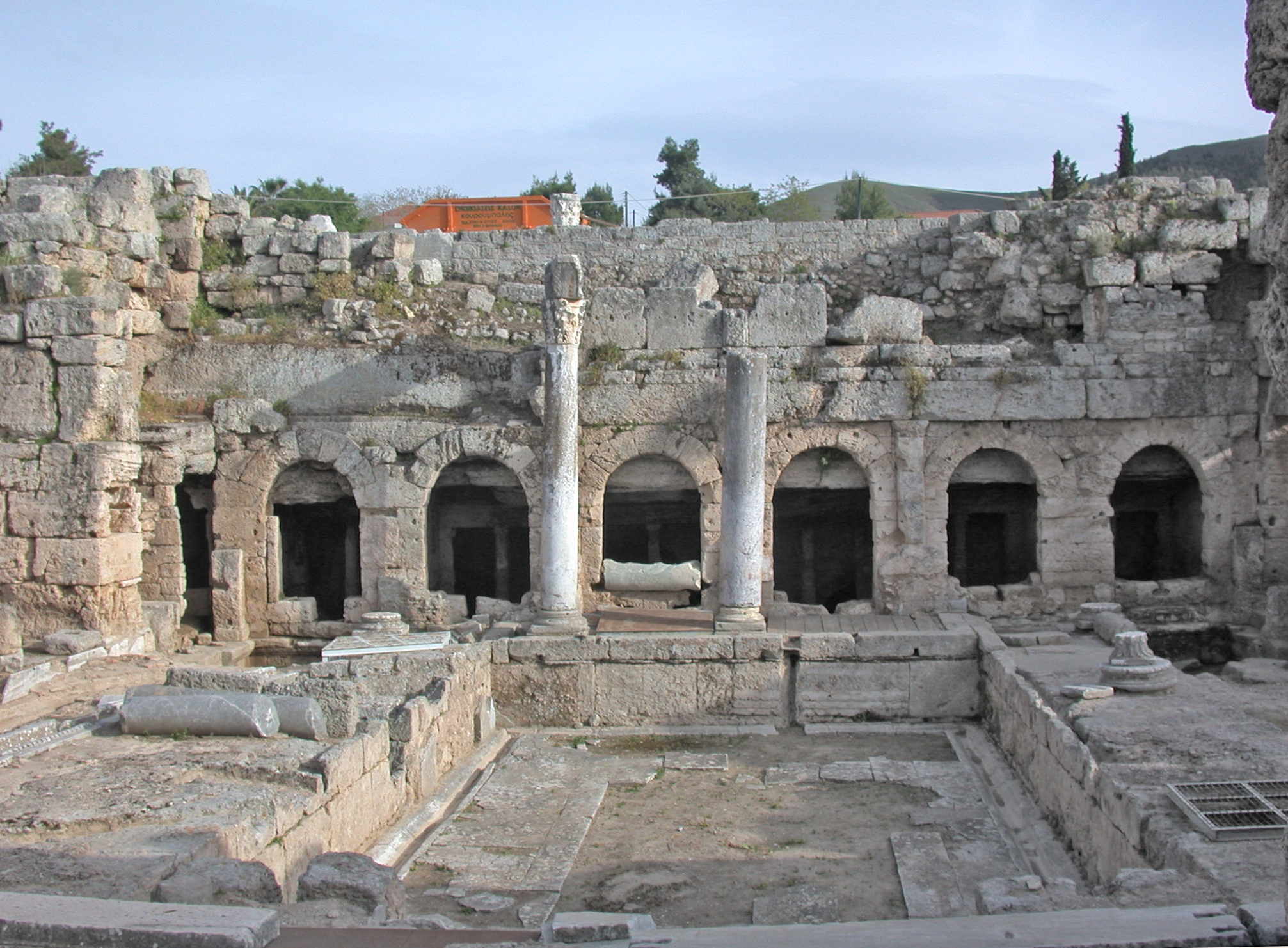
Pirene fountain

Corinth is mentioned many times in the New Testament, largely in connection with Paul the Apostle's mission there, testifying to the success of Caesar's refounding of the city. Traditionally, the Church of Corinth is believed to have been founded by Paul, making it an Apostolic See.

The apostle Paul first visited the city in AD 49 or 50, when Gallio, the brother of Seneca, was proconsul of Achaia. Paul resided here for eighteen months (see Acts 18:11). Here he first became acquainted with Priscilla and Aquila, with whom he later traveled. They worked here together as tentmakers (from which is derived the modern Christian concept of tentmaking), and regularly attended the synagogue.

In AD 51/52, Gallio presided over the trial of the Apostle Paul in Corinth. Silas and Timothy rejoined Paul here, having last seen him in Berea (Acts 18:5). Acts 18:6 suggests that Jewish refusal to accept his preaching here led Paul to resolve no longer to speak in the synagogues where he travelled: "From now on I will go to the Gentiles". However, on his arrival in Ephesus (Acts 18:19), the narrative records that Paul went to the synagogue to preach.

Paul wrote at least two epistles to the Christian church, the First Epistle to the Corinthians (written from Ephesus) and the Second Epistle to the Corinthians (written from Macedonia). Both canonical epistles occasionally reflect the conflict between the missionary ambitions of the thriving Christian church and a strong desire to remain separate from the surrounding community.

Some scholars believe that Paul visited Corinth for an intermediate "painful visit" (see 2 Corinthians 2:1) between the first and second epistles. After writing the second epistle, he stayed in Corinth for about three months in the late winter, and there wrote his Epistle to the Romans.

Based on clues within the Corinthian epistles themselves, some scholars have concluded that Paul wrote possibly as many as four epistles to the church at Corinth. Only two are contained within the Christian canon (First and Second Epistles to the Corinthians); the other two letters are lost. (The lost letters would probably represent the very first letter that Paul wrote to the Corinthians and the third one, and so the First and Second Letters of the canon would be the second and the fourth if four were written.) Many scholars think that the third one (known as the "letter of the tears"; see 2 Cor 2:4) is included inside the canonical Second Epistle to the Corinthians (it would be chapters 10–13). This letter is not to be confused with the so-called "Third Epistle to the Corinthians", which is a pseudepigraphical letter written many years after the death of Paul.

There are speculations from Bruce Winter that the Jewish access to their own food in Corinth was disallowed after Paul's departure. By this theory, Paul had instructed Christian Gentiles to maintain Jewish access to food according to their dietary laws. This speculation is contested by David Rudolph, who argues that there is no evidence to support this theory. He argues instead that Paul had desired the Gentile Christians to remain assimilated within their Gentile communities and not adopt Jewish dietary procedures.

=== Medieval Roman (Byzantine) era ===
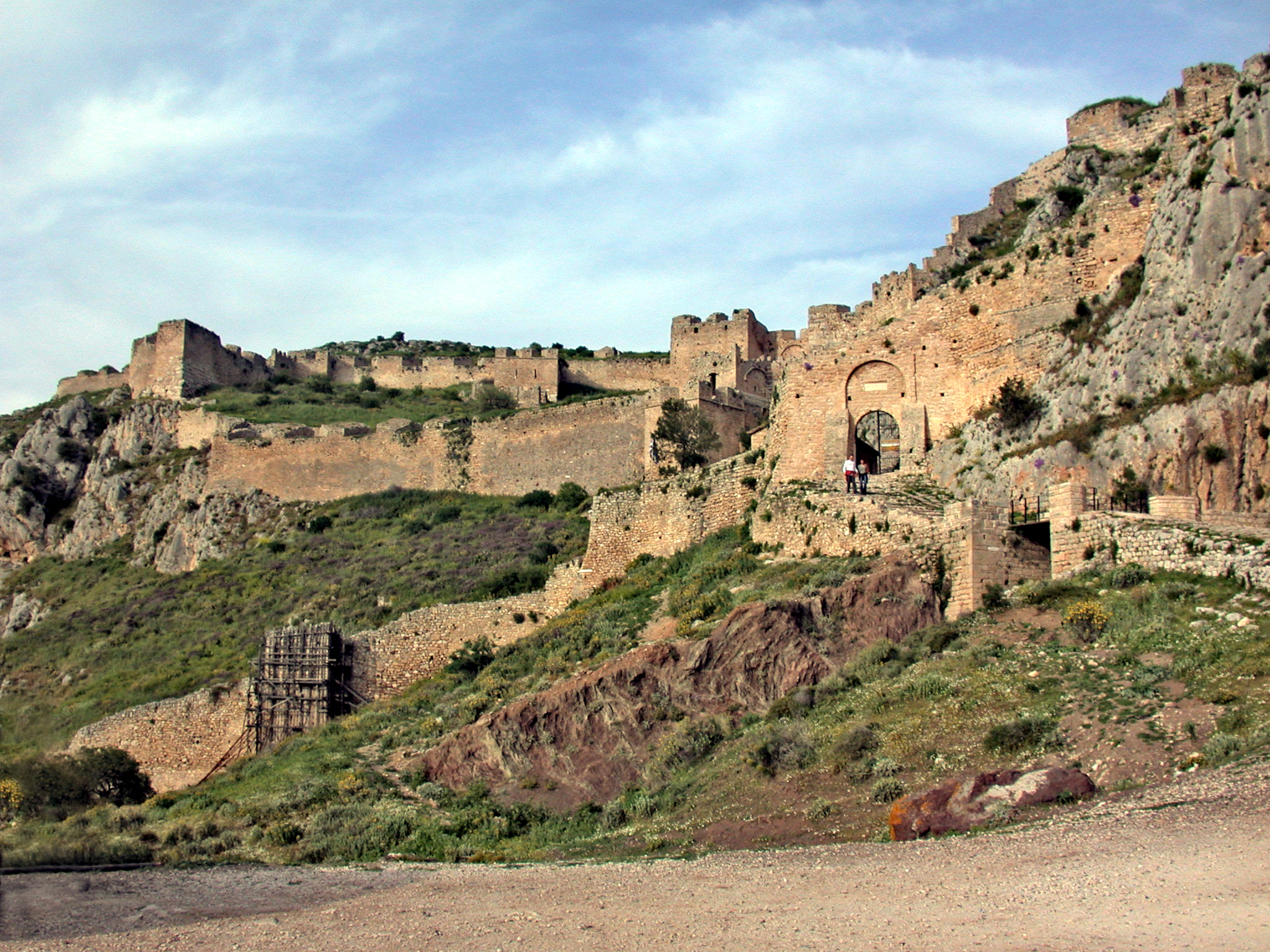
The walled gates of Acrocorinth

The city was largely destroyed in the earthquakes of AD 365 and AD 375, followed by Alaric's invasion in 396. The city was rebuilt after these disasters on a monumental scale, but covered a much smaller area than previously. Four churches were located in the city proper, another on the citadel of the Acrocorinth, and a monumental basilica at the port of Lechaion.

During the reign of Emperor Justinian I (527–565), a large stone wall was erected from the Saronic to the Corinthian gulfs, protecting the city and the Peloponnese peninsula from the barbarian invasions from the north. The stone wall was about six miles (10 km) long and was named Hexamilion ("six-miles").

In the end of the 6th century a group of Slavs raided Corinth. Their chieftain looted a ciborium from a church, which he then used as a tent and living space. The city continued to decline, and may even have fallen to barbarian invaders in the early 7th century. The main settlement moved from the lower city to the Acrocorinth. Despite its becoming the capital of the theme of Hellas and, after c. 800, of the theme of the Peloponnese, it was not until the 9th century that the city began to recover, reaching its apogee in the 11th and 12th centuries, when it was the site of a flourishing silk industry.

In November 856, an earthquake in Corinth killed an estimated 45,000.

The wealth of the city attracted the attention of the Italo-Normans under Roger II of Sicily, who plundered it in 1147, carrying off many captives, most notably silk weavers. The city never fully recovered from the Norman sack.

=== Principality of Achaea ===
Following the sack of Constantinople by the Fourth Crusade, a group of Crusaders under the French knights William of Champlitte and Geoffrey of Villehardouin carried out the conquest of the Peloponnese. The Corinthians resisted the Frankish conquest from their stronghold in Acrocorinth, under the command of Leo Sgouros, from 1205 until 1210. In 1208 Leo Sgouros killed himself by riding off the top of Acrocorinth, but resistance continued for two more years. Finally, in 1210 the fortress fell to the Crusaders, and Corinth became a full part of the Principality of Achaea, governed by the Villehardouins from their capital in Andravida in Elis. Corinth was the last significant town of Achaea on its northern borders with another crusader state, the Duchy of Athens. The Ottomans captured the city in 1395. The Byzantines of the Despotate of the Morea recaptured it in 1403, and the Despot Theodore II Palaiologos, restored the Hexamilion wall across the Isthmus of Corinth in 1415.

=== Ottoman rule ===
In 1458, five years after the final Fall of Constantinople, the Turks of the Ottoman Empire conquered the city and its mighty castle. The Ottomans renamed it Gördüs (گوردوس) and made it a sanjak (district) centre within the Rumelia Eyalet. The Venetians captured the city in 1687 during the Morean War, and it remained under Venetian control until the Ottomans retook the city in 1715. Corinth was the capital of the Mora Eyalet in 1715–1731 and then again a sanjak capital until 1821.

=== Independence ===
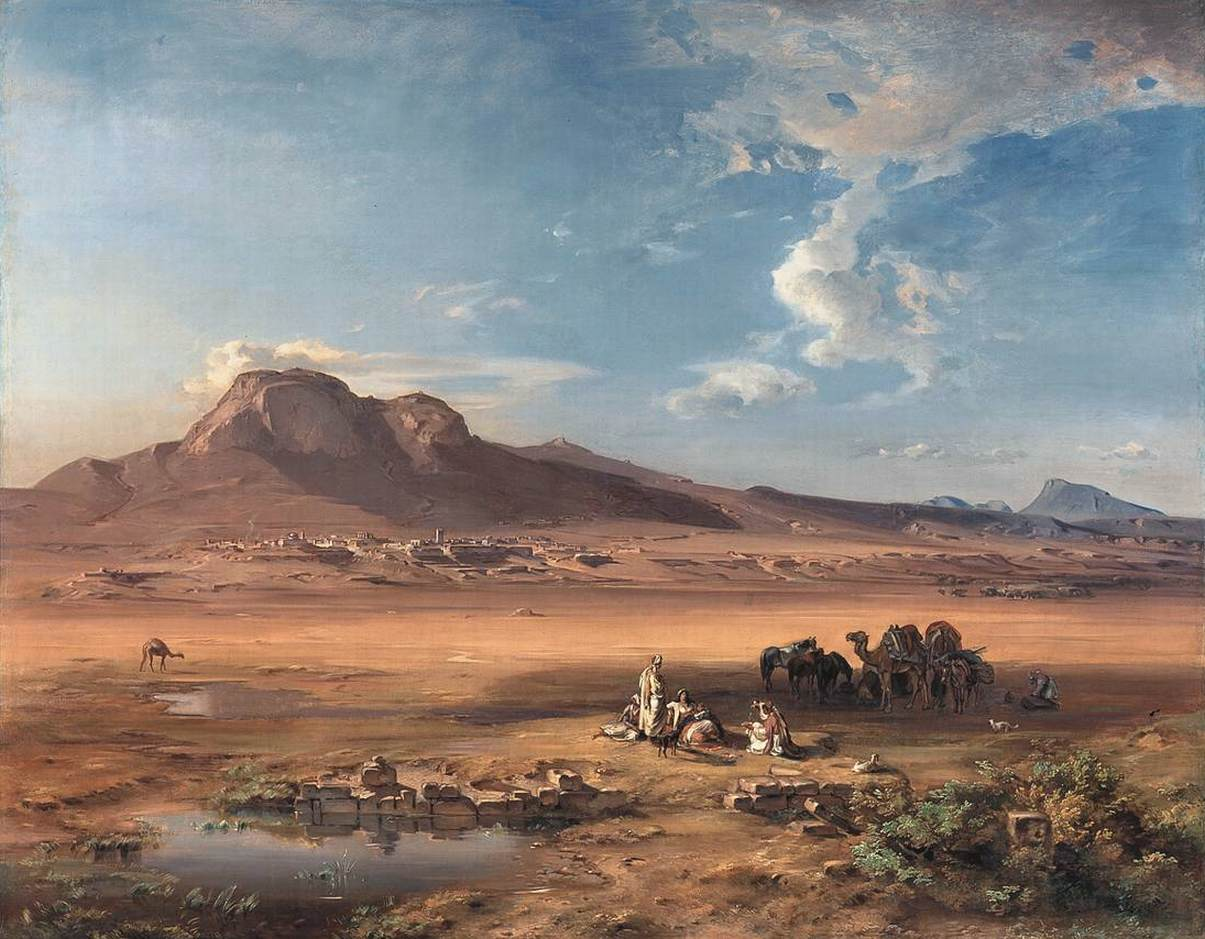
Corinth with Acrocorinth by Carl Anton Joseph Rottmann, 1847

During the Greek War of Independence, 1821–1830 the city was contested by the Ottoman forces. At that time, the Arvanite tribes living to the north of the Isthmus of Corinth attacked the acropolis of the city. They were around 2000 musketeers against the Ottoman troops. The city was officially liberated in 1832 after the Treaty of London. In 1833, the site was considered among the candidates for the new capital city of the recently founded Kingdom of Greece, due to its historical significance and strategic position. Nafplio was chosen initially, then Athens.

== Ancient city and its environs ==
=== Acrocorinth, the acropolis ===
The Acrocorinth (Ἀκροκόρινθος, Akrokórinthos), the acropolis of ancient Corinth, is a monolithic rock that was continuously occupied from archaic times to the early 19th century. The city's archaic acropolis, already an easily defensible position due to its geomorphology, was further heavily fortified during the Byzantine Empire as it became the seat of the strategos of the Thema of Hellas. Later it was a fortress of the Franks after the Fourth Crusade, the Venetians and the Ottoman Turks. With its secure water supply, Acrocorinth's fortress was used as the last line of defense in southern Greece because it commanded the isthmus of Corinth, repelling foes from entry into the Peloponnesian peninsula. Three circuit walls formed the man-made defense of the hill. The highest peak on the site was home to a temple to Aphrodite which was Christianized as a church, and then became a mosque. The American School began excavations on it in 1929. Currently, Acrocorinth is one of the most important medieval castle sites of Greece.

=== Two ports: Lechaeum and Cenchreae ===
Corinth had two harbours: Lechaeum on the Corinthian Gulf and Cenchreae on the Saronic Gulf. Lechaeum was the principal port, connected to the city with a set of long walls of about 3 kilometres (1.9 mi) length, and was the main trading station for Italy and Sicily, where there were many Corinthian colonies, while Cenchreae served the commerce with the Eastern Mediterranean. Ships could be transported between the two harbours by means of the diolkos constructed by the tyrant Periander.

== Excavations ==
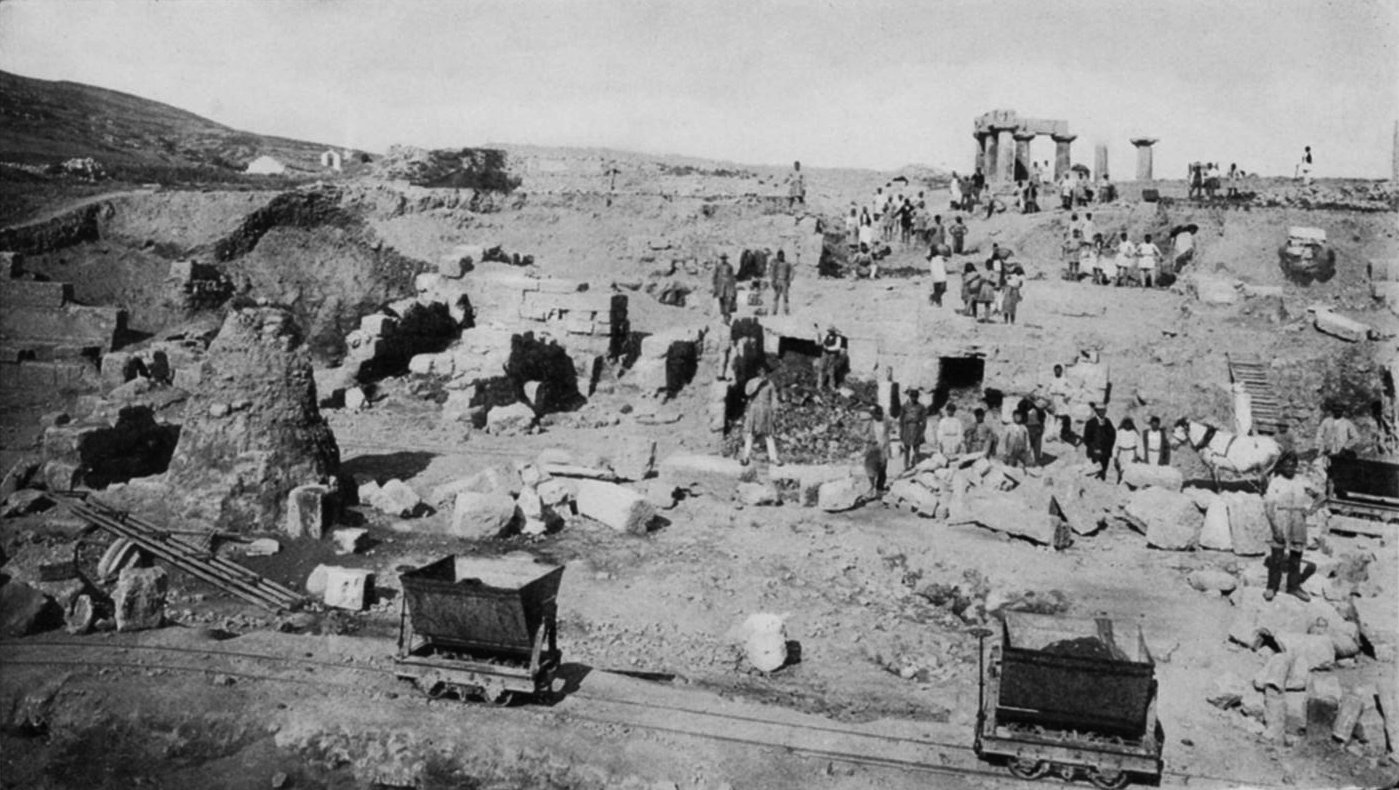
View of the excavations in 1898

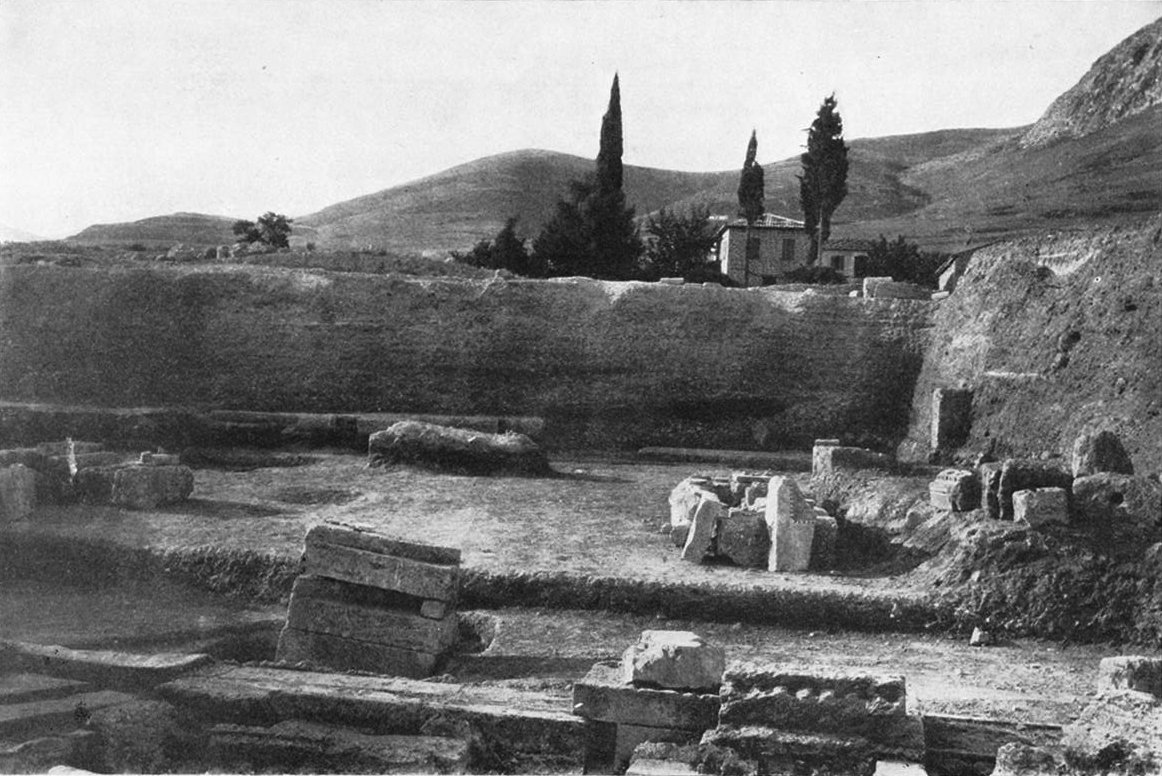
View of the excavations in 1905

The Corinth Excavations by the American School of Classical Studies at Athens began in 1896 and have continued with little interruption until today. Restricted by the modern village of Ancient Corinth, which directly overlies the ancient city, the main focus of School investigations has been on the area surrounding the mid-6th century B.C. Temple of Apollo. This dominating monument has been one of the only features of the site visible since antiquity. Archaeologists such as Bert Hodge Hill, Carl Blegen, William Dinsmoor Sr., Oscar Broneer, and Rhys Carpenter worked to uncover much of the site before WWII. Since then, under the leadership of directors Henry Robinson (1959–1965), Charles K. Williams II (1965–1997) and Guy D. R. Sanders (1997–present), excavation has clarified the archaeological history of the city. Investigations have revealed remains extending from the Early Neolithic period (6500-5750 B.C.) through to early modern times.

Archaeological work has also been done outside the immediate area of the village center including at the Sanctuary of Demeter and Kore on the slopes of Acrocorinth, in the Potters’ Quarter, at the sites of the Sanctuary of Asklepios and the Kenchreian Gate Basilica. Current investigations focus on the area of the Panayia Field, located to the southeast of the Forum. School excavations and projects affiliated to the ASCSA have also intensively explored the wider area of the Corinthia including the surrounding settlements of Korakou, Kenchreai and Isthmia. Finds from these works are housed in the Archaeological Museum of Ancient Corinth.

== Modern Corinth ==
In 1858, the village surrounding the ruins of Ancient Corinth was destroyed by an earthquake, leading to the establishment of New Corinth 3 km (1.9 mi) north east of the ancient city.

== Important monuments ==
- Acrocorinth Sanctuary of Demeter and Kore
- Asklepieion of Corinth
- Basilica Julia (Corinth)
- Bema (Ancient Corinth) (later Church of Apostle Paul)
- Fountain of Glauke
- Peirene
- Roman Odeion at Corinth
- Sacred Spring of Corinth
- South Stoa
- Temple E at Corinth
- Temple of Apollo (Corinth)

== Notable people ==
=== Ancient Greece ===
- Archias (8th century BC), founder of Syracuse
- Desmon (8th century BC), athlete
- Diocles (8th century BC), athlete
- Diogenes of Sinope, 4th century BC, one of the world's best known cynics
- Eumelus (8th century BC), poet
- Periander (7th century BC), listed as one of the Seven Sages of Greece
- Xeniades (5th century BC), philosopher
- Xenophon (5th century BC), athlete
- Dinarchus (4th century BC), orator and logographer
- Timoleon (4th century BC), statesman and general
- Euphranor (4th century BC), sculptor and painter
- Achaicus (1st century AD), Christian
- Adrian of Corinth (3rd century AD), Christian saint and martyr
- Quadratus (3rd century AD), Christian saint and martyr

=== Medieval ===
- Cyriacus the Anchorite (5th century), Christian saint
- William of Moerbeke (13th century), first translator of Aristotle's works into Latin

== In literature ==
- Alcmaeon in Corinth, a play by Greek dramatist Euripides, premiered in 405 BC
- The Queen of Corinth, a play by English dramatist John Fletcher, published in 1647

== See also ==
- Corinthian bronze
- Corinthian helmet
- Isthmian Games
- Temple of Isthmia
