= Pirene (fountain) =

Mythological fountain in ancient Corinth, Greece

Coordinates: 37°53′21″N 22°52′11″E

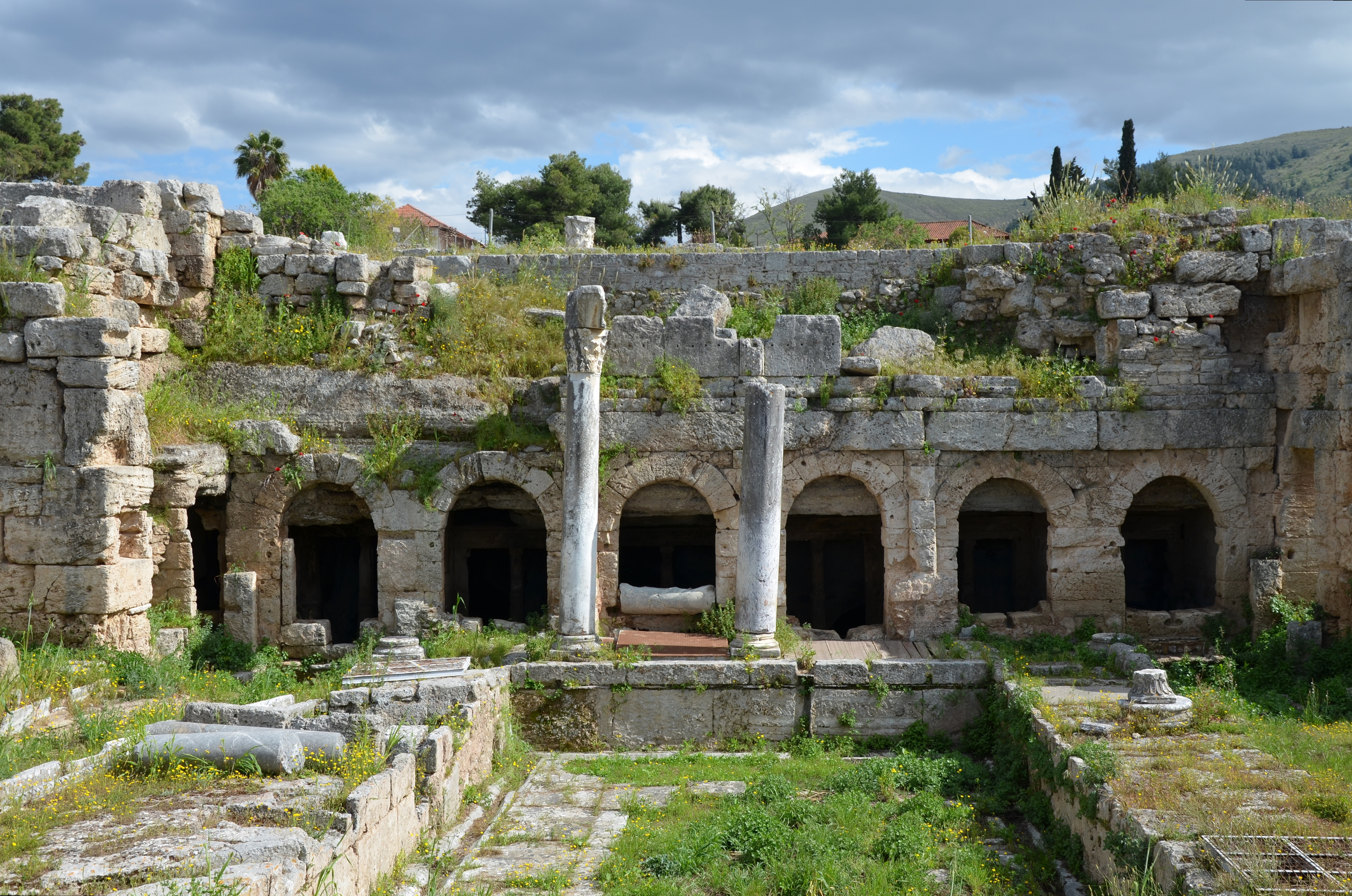
The Fountain of Peirene

Pirene or Peirene (Greek: Πειρήνη) is the name of a fountain or spring in Greek mythology, physically located in Corinth. It was said to be a favored watering-hole of Pegasus, sacred to the Muses. Poets would travel there to drink and receive inspiration.

In the 2nd century AD, the traveler Pausanias describes Pirene as follows:

On leaving the market-place along the road to Lechaeum you come to a gateway, on which are two gilded chariots, one carrying Phaethon the son of Helius, the other Helius himself. A little farther away from the gateway, on the right as you go in, is a bronze Heracles. After this is the entrance to the water of Peirene. The legend about Peirene is that she was a woman who became a spring because of her tears shed in lamentation for her son Cenchrias, who was unintentionally killed by Artemis. The spring is ornamented with white marble, and there have been made chambers like caves, out of which the water flows into an open-air well. It is pleasant to drink, and they say that the Corinthian bronze, when red-hot, is tempered by this water, since bronze […] the Corinthians have not. Moreover near Peirene are an image and a sacred enclosure of Apollo; in the latter is a painting of the exploit of Odysseus against the suitors.

Another story says that the fountain was created by the hoof of Pegasus striking the ground. The legend Pausanias cites is far more widespread.

The Upper Pirene spring, with its own etiological myth, is located on Acrocorinth, the acropolis of Corinth.

== See also ==
- Pirene, a nymph who, according to legend, gave the name to the fountain.
