= Acrocorinth =

Fortified rocky hill, the acropolis of the ancient city of Corinth, Greece

Coordinates: 37°53′26″N 22°52′21″E

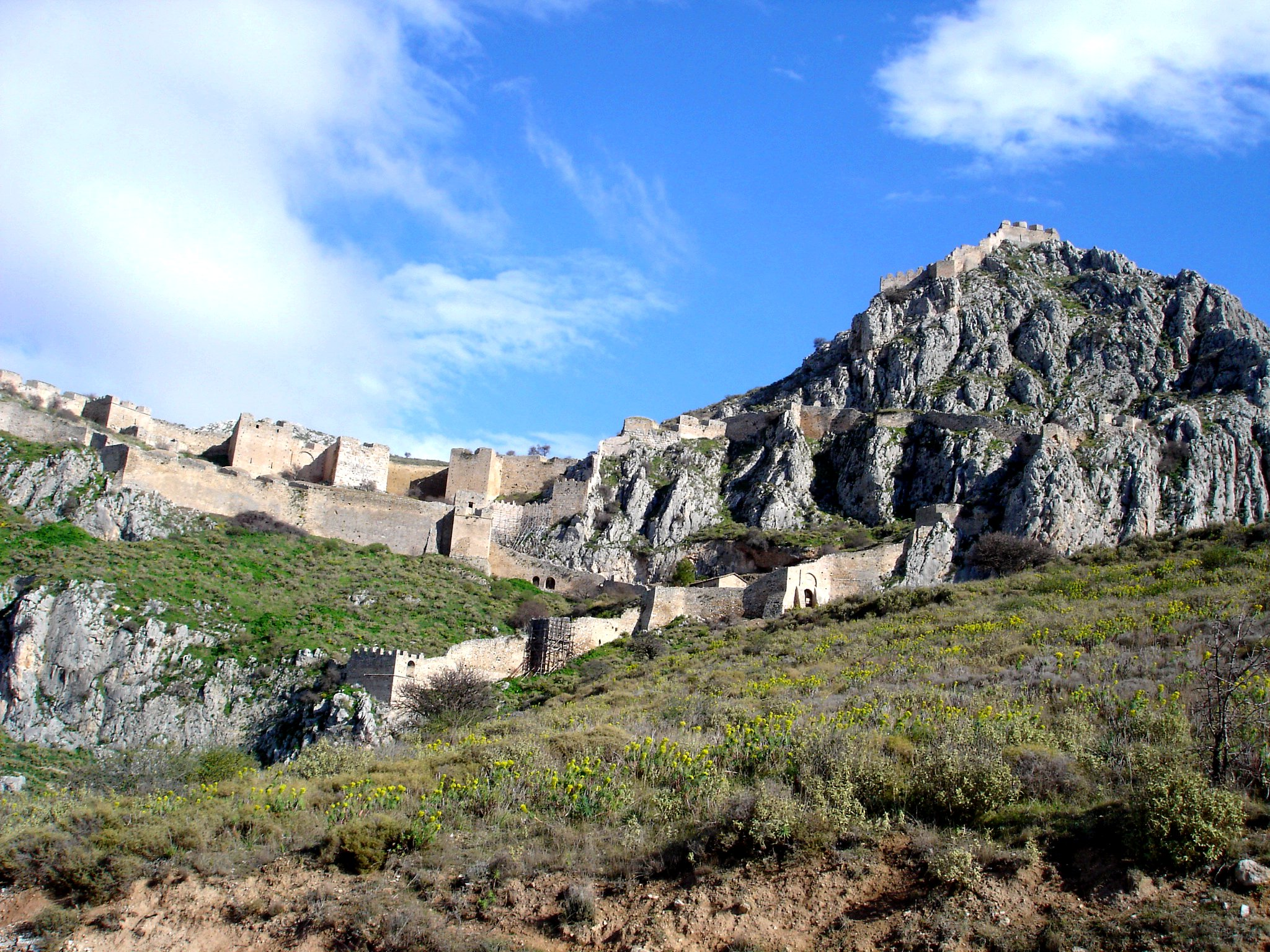
The walled gates of Acrocorinth, as rebuilt by the Venetians.

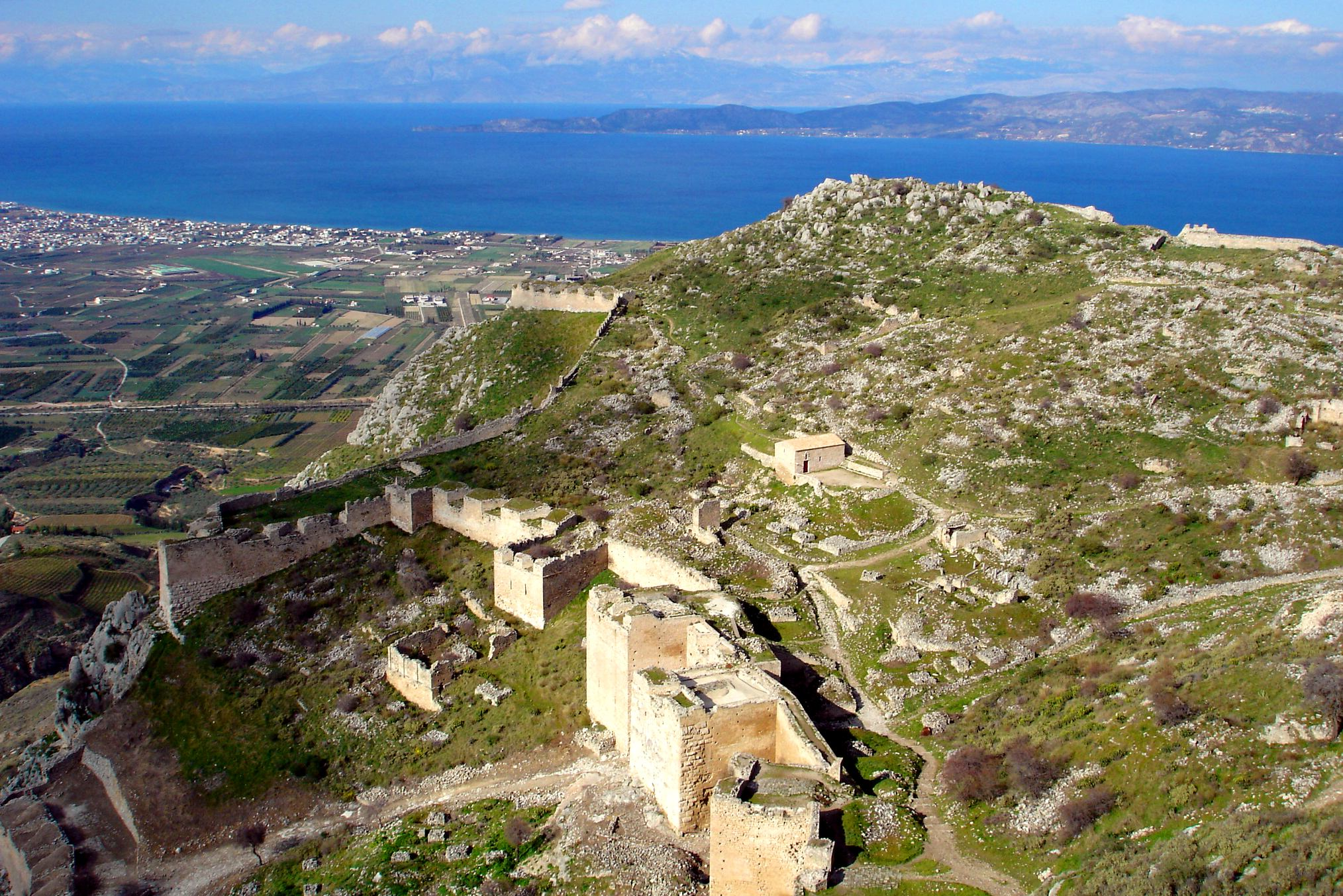
Acrocorinth, looking north towards the Gulf of Corinth.

Acrocorinth (Greek: Ακροκόρινθος, lit. 'Upper Corinth' or 'the acropolis of ancient Corinth') is a monolithic rock overlooking the ancient city of Corinth, Greece. In the estimation of George Forrest, "It is the most impressive of the acropolis of mainland Greece."

With its secure water supply, Acrocorinth's fortress was repeatedly used as a last line of defense in southern Greece because it commanded the Isthmus of Corinth, repelling foes from entry by land into the Peloponnese peninsula.

== History ==
The Acrocorinth was continuously occupied from archaic times to the early 19th Century. Along with Demetrias and Chalcis, the Acrocorinth during the Hellenistic period formed one of the so-called “Fetters of Greece” – three fortresses garrisoned by the Macedonians to secure their control of the Greek city-states.

The city's archaic acropolis was already an easily defensible position due to its geomorphology; it was further heavily fortified during the Byzantine Empire as it became the seat of the strategos of the thema of Hellas and later of the Peloponnese. It was defended against the Crusaders for three years by Leo Sgouros. Afterwards it became a fortress of the Frankish Principality of Achaea, the Venetians, and the Ottoman Turks.

Three circuit walls formed the man-made defense of the hill. The highest peak on the site was home to a temple to Aphrodite. The temple was converted to a church, which in turn was converted to a mosque.

The American School's Corinth Excavations began excavations on the Acrocorinth in 1929. Currently, it is one of the most important medieval castle sites of Greece.

== Myths and legends ==
In a Corinthian myth related in the 2nd century CE to Pausanias, Briareus, one of the Hecatoncheires, was the arbitrator in a dispute between Poseidon (the sea) and Helios (the sun): His verdict was that the Isthmus of Corinth belonged to Poseidon and the acropolis of Corinth (Acrocorinth) to Helios.

The Upper Pirene spring is located within the encircling walls. "The spring, which is behind the temple, they say was the gift of Asopus to Sisyphus. The latter knew, so runs the legend, that Zeus had ravished Aegina, the daughter of Asopus, but refused to give information to the seeker before he had a spring given him on the Acrocorinthus."

== Gallery ==
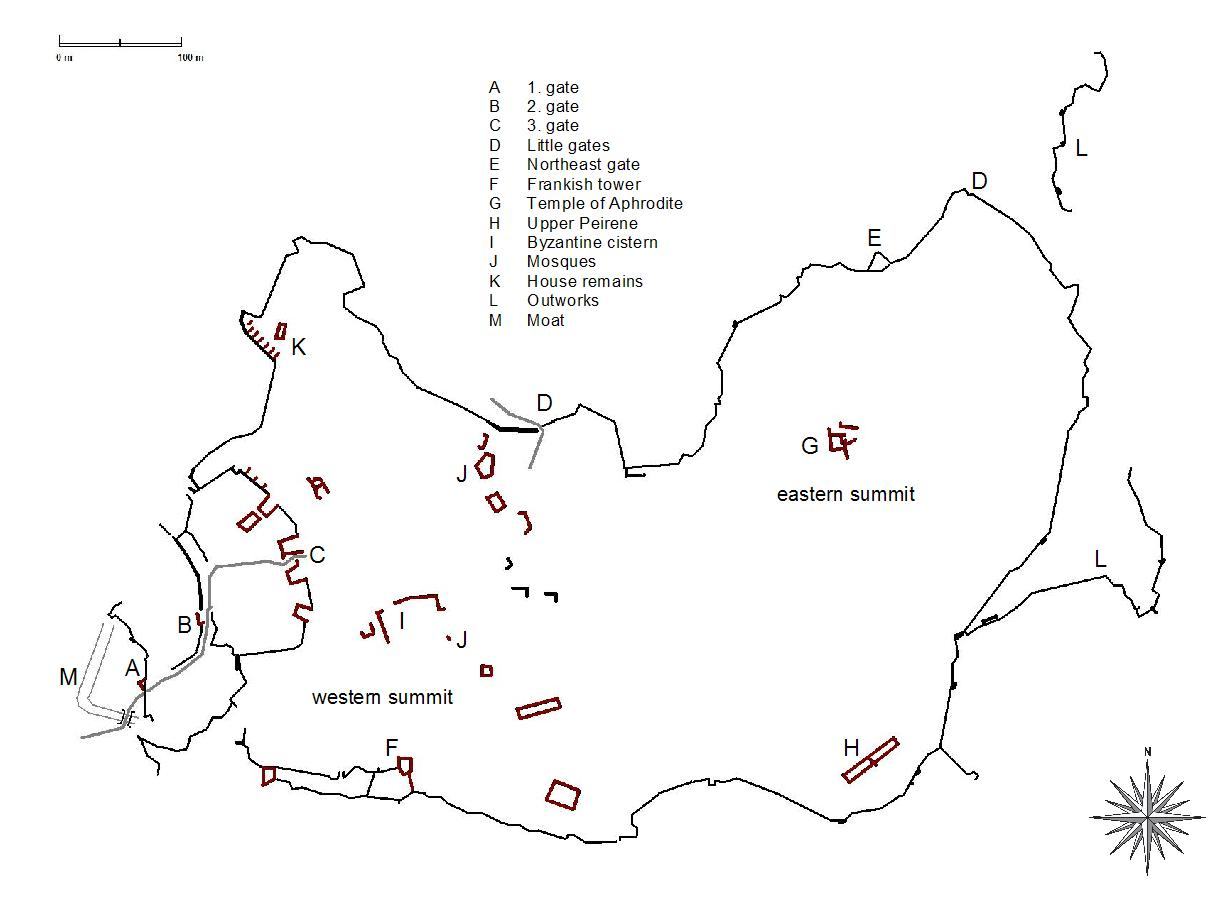
Map of Acrocorinth

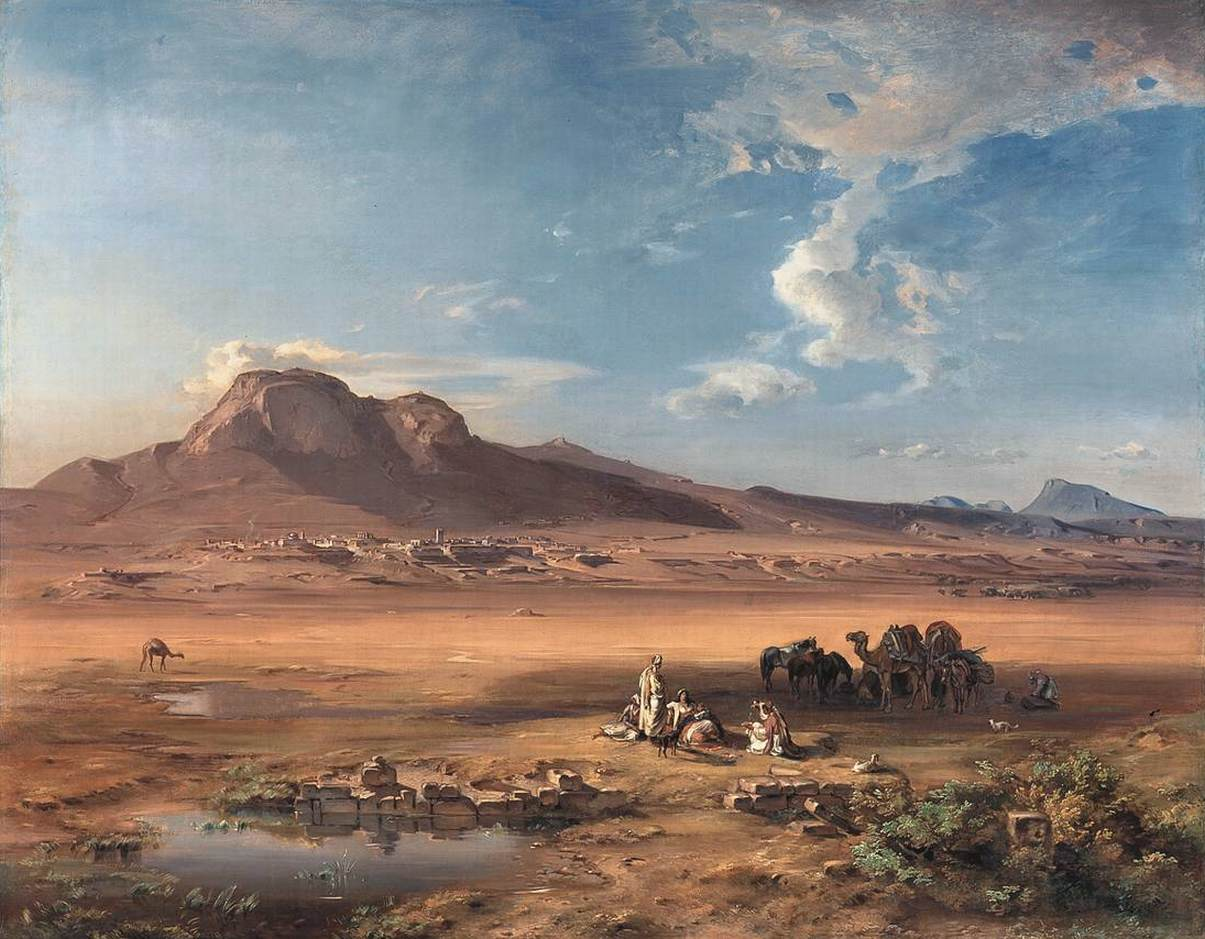
Corinth with Acrocorinth by Carl Anton Joseph Rottmann, 1847

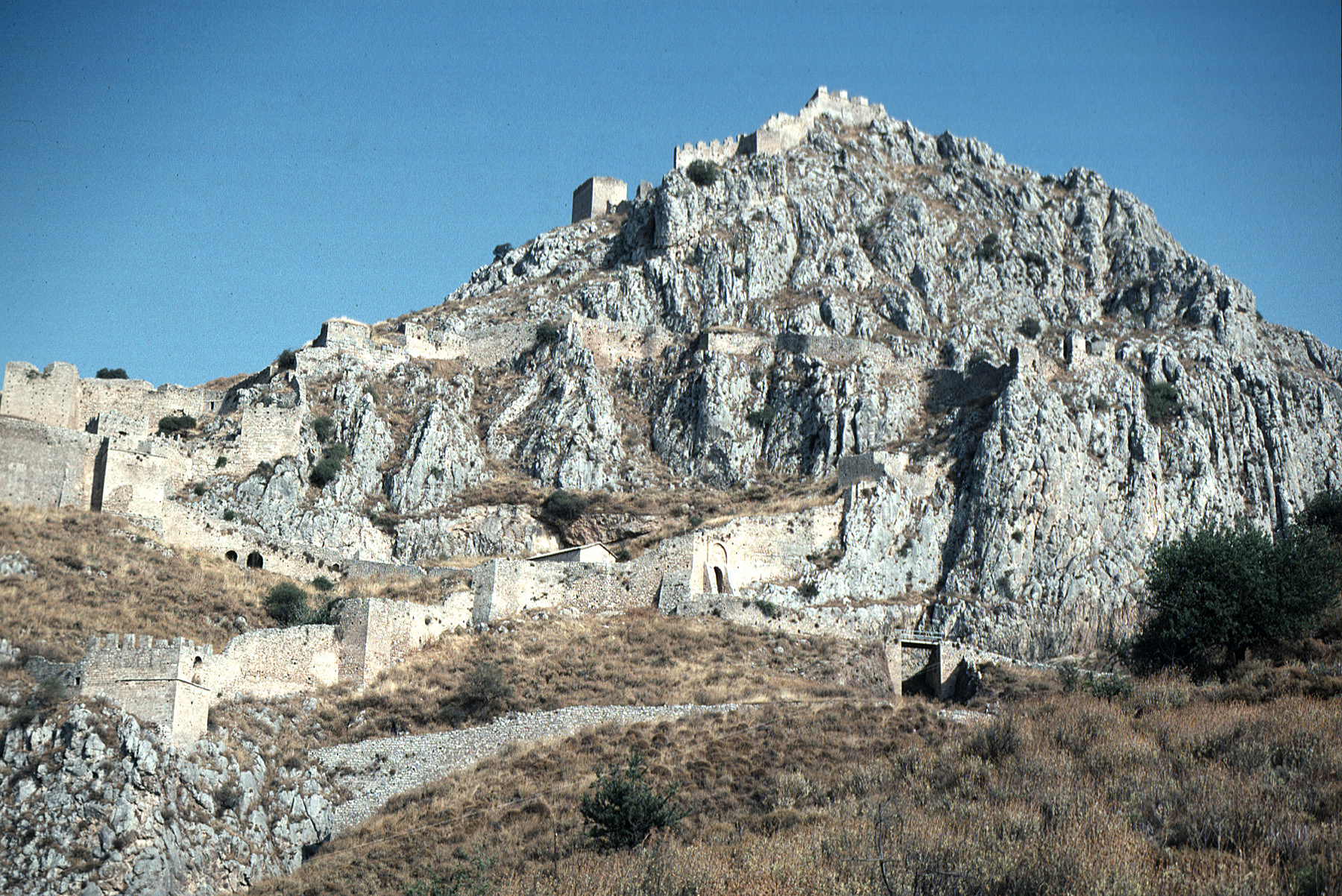
View of Acrocorinth walled gates, as rebuilt by the Venetians.

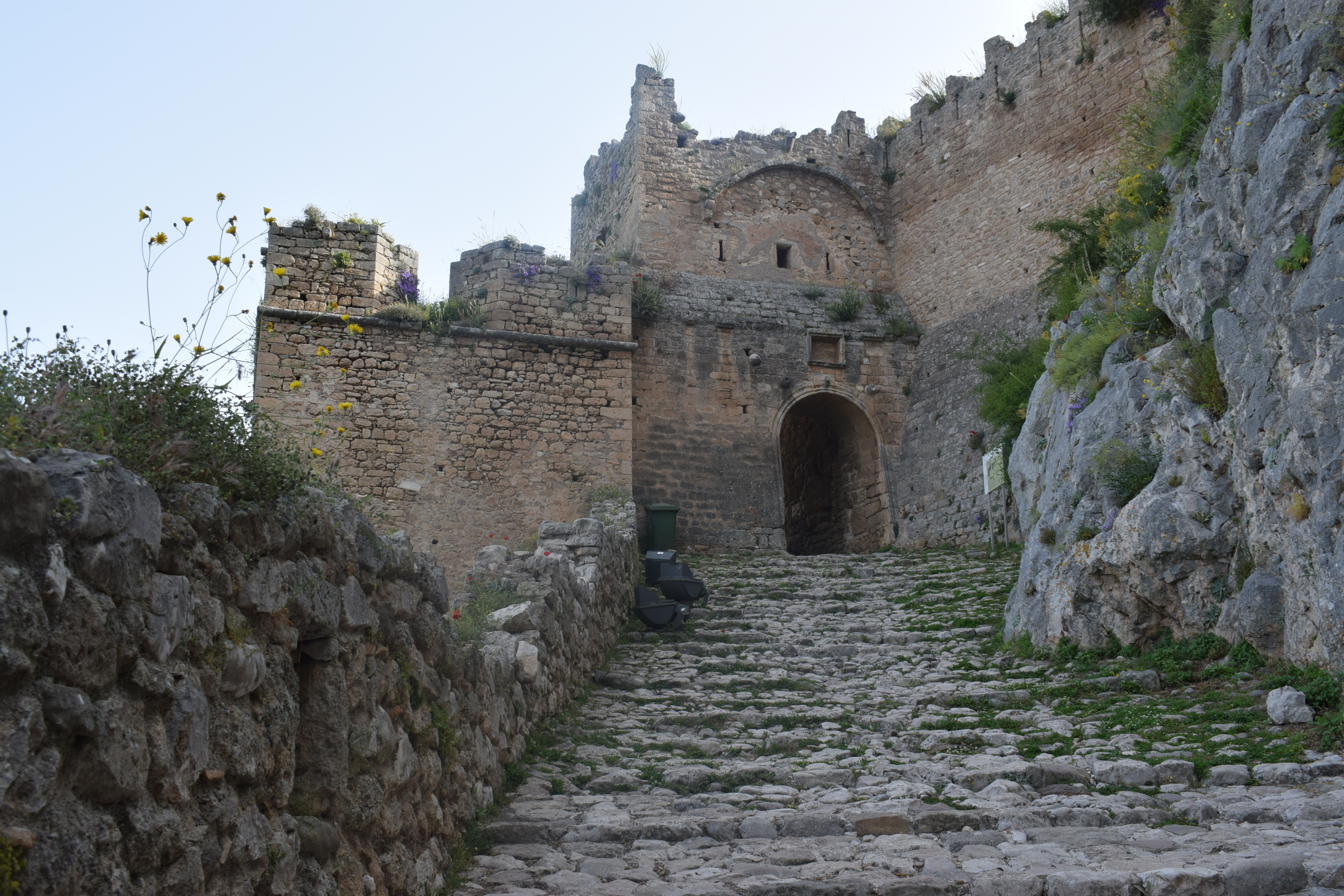
Inner (second) western Gate

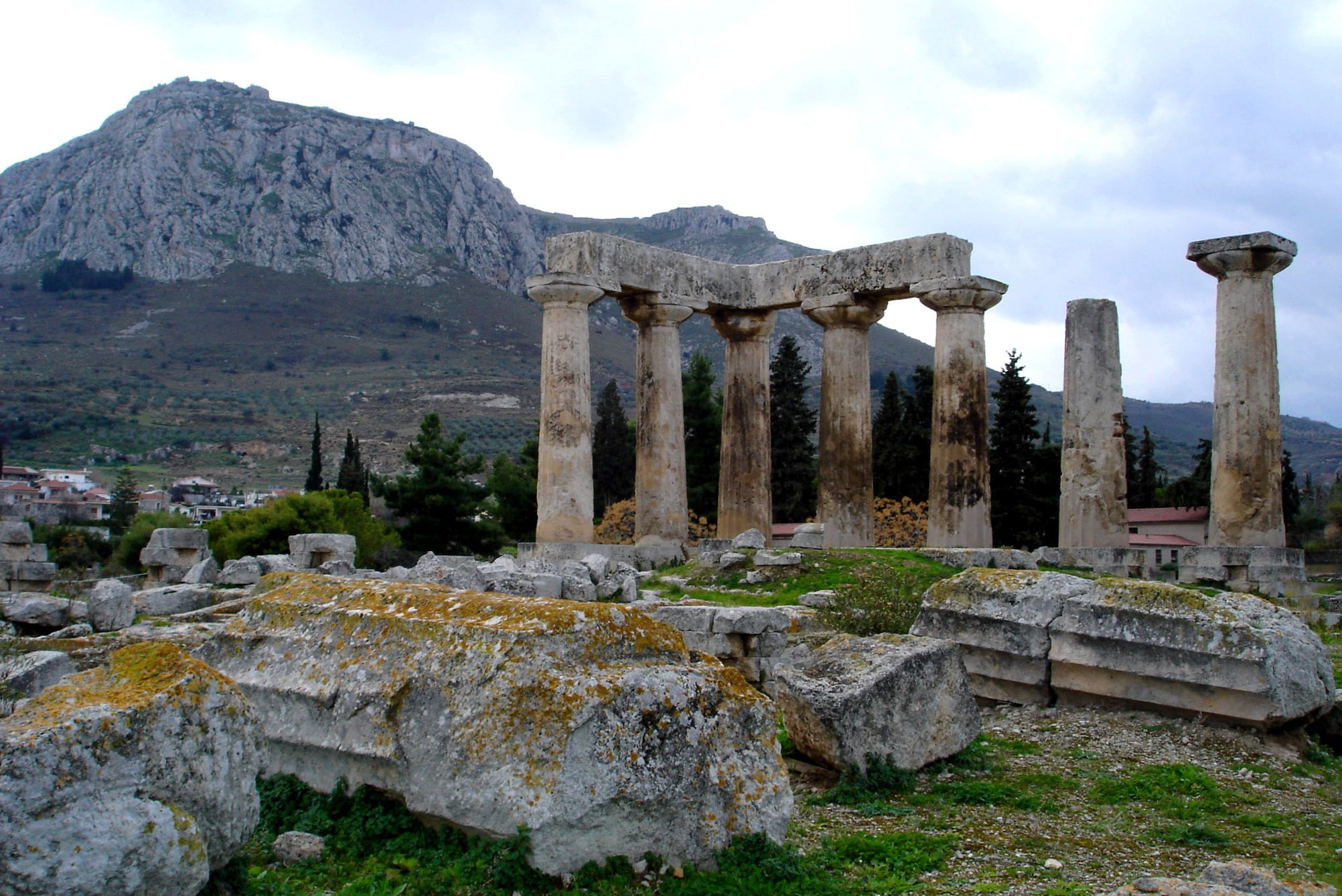
Temple of Apollo with Acrocorinth in the background
