= Second Coming =

Christian and Islamic belief that Jesus will eventually return to Earth

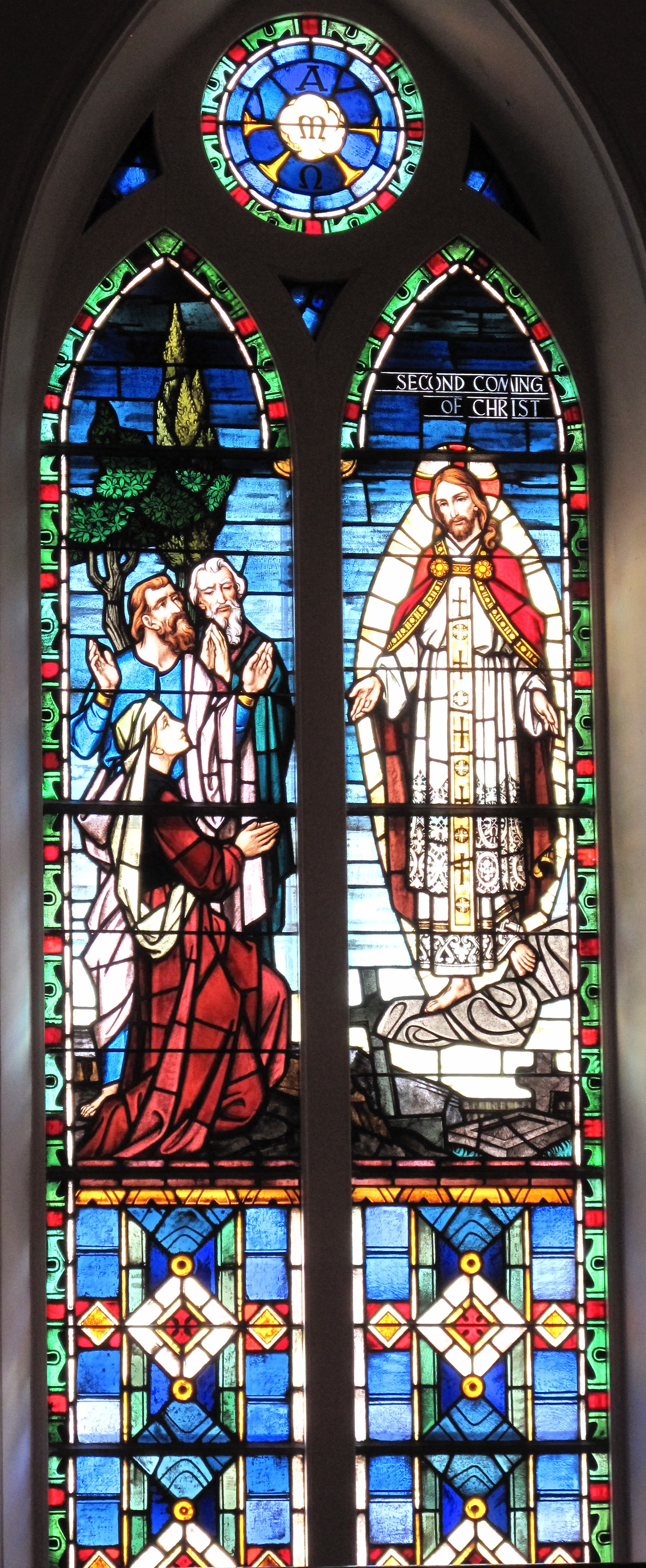
The Second Coming of Christ stained glass window at St. Matthew's German Evangelical Lutheran Church in Charleston, South Carolina, United States

The Second Coming (sometimes called the Second Advent or the Parousia) is the Christian and Islamic belief that Jesus Christ will return to Earth after his ascension to Heaven (the Ascension is said to have occurred about two thousand years ago). The idea is based on messianic prophecies and is part of most Christian eschatologies.

In Islamic eschatology, Jesus (ʿĪsā ibn Maryam) is also believed to return in the end times. According to Islamic belief, he will descend from Heaven to defeat the false messiah (al-Masih ad-Dajjal), break the cross,^{[Sahih al-Bukhari 2476]} restore justice, and reaffirm monotheism. His return is regarded as one of the major signs of the Day of Judgment, and he is viewed not as divine but as a revered prophet in Islamic theology.

Other faiths have various interpretations of it. Some minor religious movements, e.g. the Church of the Last Testament, believe that the founder of a given religious group was a next incarnation of the Jesus Christ.

== Terminology ==
Several different terms are used to refer to the Second Coming of Christ:

In the New Testament, the Greek word ἐπιφάνεια (epiphaneia, appearing) is used six times to refer to the return of Christ.

The Greek New Testament uses the Greek term parousia (παρουσία, meaning "arrival", "coming", or "presence") 24 times, seventeen of them concerning Christ. However, parousia has the distinct reference to a period of time rather than an instant in time. At Matthew 24:37, the word parousia is used to clearly describe the period of time in which Noah lived. The Greek word eleusis, which means "coming", is not interchangeable with parousia. So this parousia or "presence" would be unique and distinct from anything that had occurred before. The word is also used six times referring to individuals (Stephanas, Fortunatus and Achaicus, Titus, and Paul the Apostle) and once referring to the "coming of the lawless one".

Gustav Adolf Deissmann (1908) showed that the Greek word parousia occurred as early as the 3rd century BC to describe the visit of a king or dignitary to a city – a visit arranged in order to show the visitor's magnificence to the people.

In Islam, the term Rajʽa (Arabic: الرجعة, romanized: al-rajʿah, lit. 'Return') refers to the Second Coming. The term is most commonly used by Shia Muslims.

== Specific date predictions and claims ==
Views about the nature of the Second Coming vary among Christian denominations and among individual Christians. Many specific dates have been predicted for the Second Coming, some now in the distant past, others still in the future.

== Christianity ==
Most English versions of the Nicene Creed include the following statements:

...he ascended into heaven and is seated at the right hand of the Father. He will come again in his glory to judge the living and the dead, and his kingdom will have no end. ... We look for the resurrection of the dead, and the life of the world to come.

A 2010 survey showed that about 40% of Americans at the time believed that Jesus is likely to return by 2050. This varied from 58% of white evangelical Christians, through 32% of Catholics to 27% of white mainline Protestants.

=== Early Christianity ===
Most scholars participating in the third quest for the historical Jesus view Jesus as an eschatological prophet preaching the "Kingdom of God". Some critical scholars see Jesus's predictions of an imminent parousia as mistaken, while many view it from the perspective of the conditional nature of judgement prophecy. A number of interpretations of the term "Kingdom of God" have thus appeared in its eschatological context, e.g., apocalyptic, realized or inaugurated eschatologies, yet no consensus has emerged among scholars.

While the notion of an apocalyptic Jesus remains a mainstream view among scholars, it has been challenged by proponents of other portraits. Scholars of the Jesus Seminar attribute apocalyptic expectations to the early Church rather than the historical Jesus. Some argued that the earlier traditions in the Q Source and Gospel of Thomas showed that apocalyptic eschatology was not present in earlier layers of the Jesus tradition. Recent scholarship has re-evaluated the apocalyptic ideas in the early Christian gospels not as a literal prediction of the end times, but as relating to the destruction of the Jewish Temple in 70 AD. Scholars such as R.T. France and N.T. Wright argue that the Gospels use apocalyptic language borrowed from the Old Testament to describe the destruction of the Temple in 70 AD, and passages such as Mark 13:26 concerning the "coming" of the Son of Man are not about the Second Coming, but about the vindication of the Son of Man at the Right Hand of God, where he is bestowed new authority with the Temple's destruction.

=== Preterism ===
The position associating the Second Coming with 1st century events such as the destruction of Jerusalem and of the Jewish Temple in AD 70 is known as Preterism.

Some Preterists see this "coming of the Son of Man in glory" primarily fulfilled in Jesus's death on the cross. They believe the apocalyptic signs are already fulfilled including "the sun will be dark", the "powers ... will be shaken", and "then they will see". Yet some critics note that many are missing, such as "But the day of the Lord will come as a thief in the night, in which the heavens will pass away with a great noise, and the elements will melt with fervent heat; both the earth and the works that are in it will be burned up." And "Then the sign of the Son of Man will appear in heaven, and then all the tribes of the earth will mourn, and they will see the Son of Man coming on the clouds of heaven with power and great glory."

=== Catholicism ===
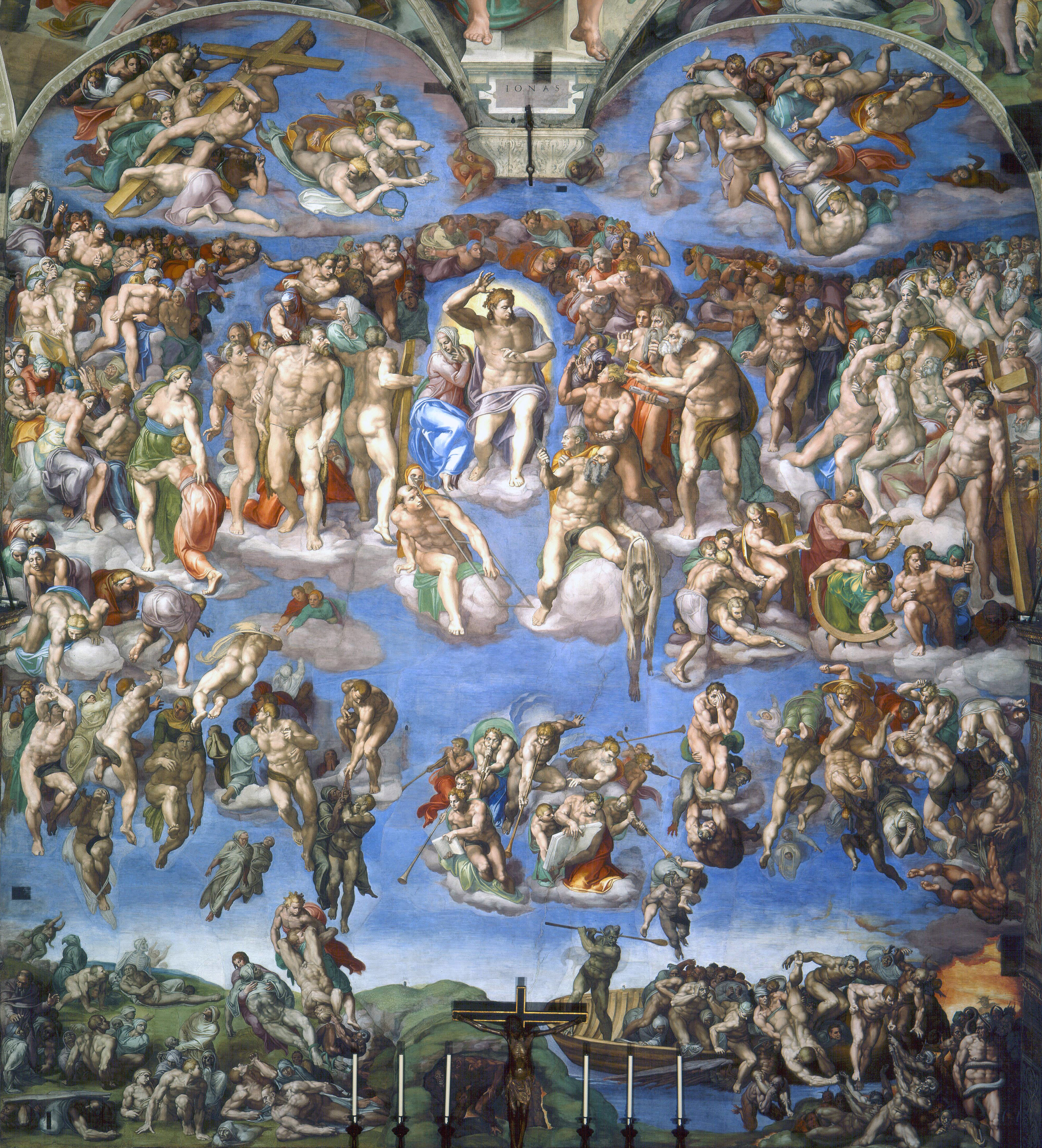
The Last Judgment by Michelangelo (1541) in the Sistine Chapel, Rome

According to the Catholic Church, the second coming will happen in a single moment, suddenly and unexpectedly (not even the angels, saints, or demons know when it will occur). It will cause the fullness of the reign of God and the consummation of the universe and mankind.

The fullness of the reign of God means God fully manifests the victory he won over his enemies (sin, suffering, and Satan) on the Cross. Just as God gradually revealed himself to Israel until the birth of Jesus, so also God gradually manifests his victory through the church's sacraments (baptism, forgiving sin, exorcising Satan, holy unction, relieving suffering, etc.), until the moment when he will fully manifest his victory through the consummation of the universe and mankind, e.g., by granting the universe and mankind a share in Jesus' resurrection (the universe being transfigured and the dead being resurrected, judged, and recompensed).

The church does not believe the second coming will happen via a catastrophe (such as a nuclear war or extinction event), reincarnation (such as someone claiming to be Jesus), social or technological progress (such as mankind abolishing slavery or curing disease), or ascendancy (such as the church having political power). Nor does the church believe in double predestination.

The second coming is suspended until Jesus is recognized by "all of Israel", and it will be preceded by a final and ultimate temptation to sin – in this case, apostasy – caused by the antichrist. Yet there are three things that hasten the second coming: the celebration of the Eucharist; Christians living with the mind of Jesus; and Christians praying for the Second Coming.

Like many Christian denominations, the church considers this second coming of Christ to be the final and eternal judgment by God of the people in every nation resulting in the glorification of some and the punishment of others. The concept is found in all the Canonical gospels, particularly the Gospel of Matthew.

A decisive factor in this Last Judgment during the second coming of Christ will be the question of whether the corporal and spiritual works of mercy were practised or not during lifetime. They rate as important acts of mercy, charity and justice. Therefore, and according to the Biblical sources (Matthew 25:31–46), the conjunction of the Last Judgment and the works of mercy is very frequent in the pictorial tradition of Christian art.

=== Oriental Orthodoxy and Eastern Orthodoxy ===
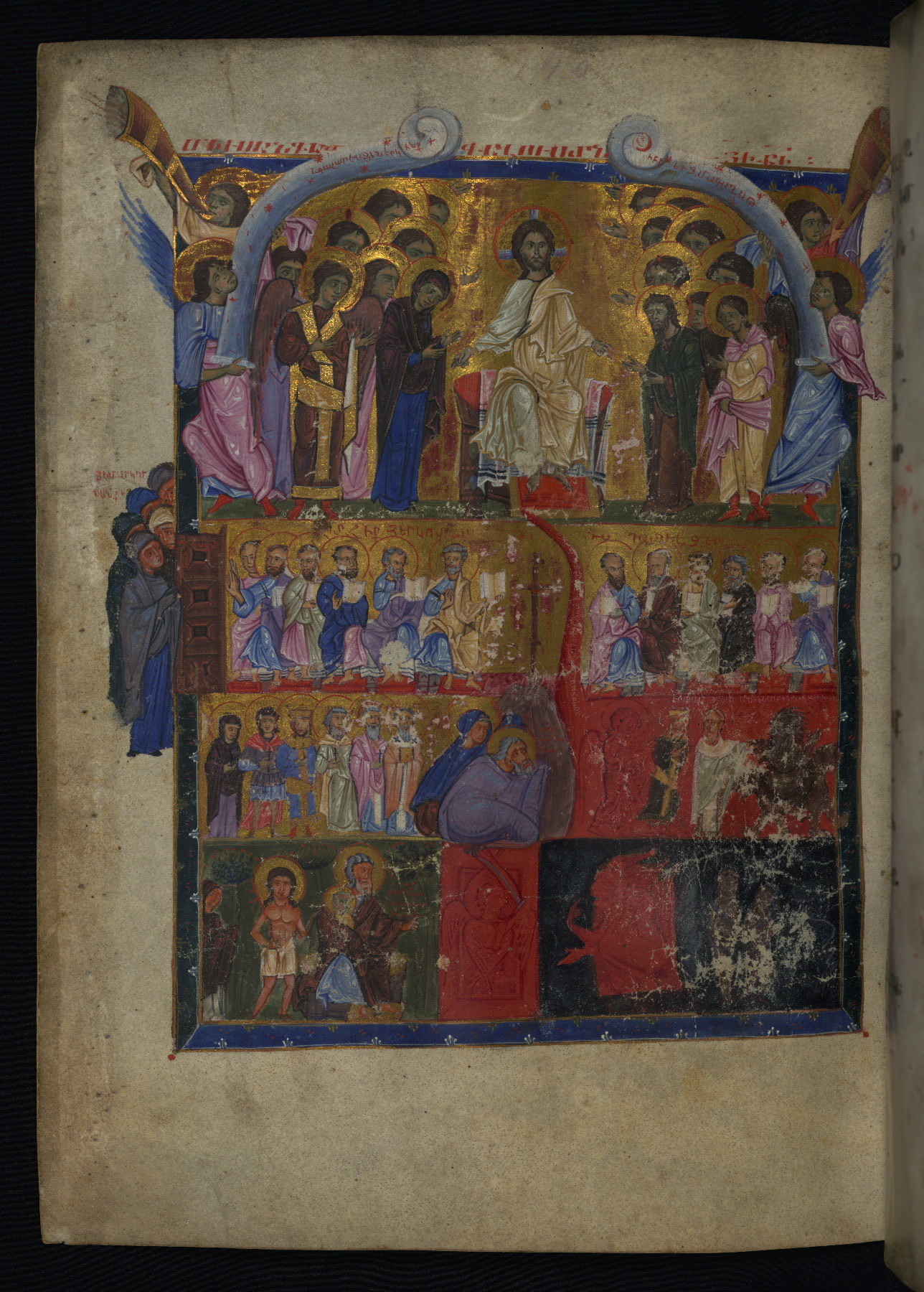
The Last Judgement by the Armenian manuscript illuminator Toros Roslin, 1262

It is the traditional view of Orthodox Christians, preserved from the early Church, that the Second Coming will be a sudden and unmistakable incident, like "a flash of lightning". They hold the general view that Jesus will not spend any time on the earth in ministry or preaching, but come to judge mankind. They teach that the ministry of the Antichrist will take place right before the Second Coming.

The Ethiopian Orthodox Church, a part of the Oriental Orthodox communion of churches, teaches that the second coming of Jesus will be radically different from his first coming, which "was to save the lost world".

=== Lutheranism and Anglicanism ===
A reference to the second coming is contained in the Nicene Creed and Apostles Creed, which is recited during the Lutheran and Anglican liturgies: "He [Jesus] shall come again in glory to judge the living and the dead; and His kingdom shall have no end." An analogous statement is also in the biblical Pauline Creed (1 Corinthians 15:23).

The Lutheran and Anglican churches proclaim the Mystery of Faith in their liturgies: "Christ has died, Christ is risen, Christ will come again."

=== Methodism ===
Methodist denominations teach that the Second Coming is connected with the Last Judgment, as professed in the Creeds.

Methodist denominations differ on the nature of the Second Coming. For example, the United Methodist Church does not teach that there will be a "rapture". On the other hand, the Evangelical Methodist Church Conference teaches, with regard to the Second Coming of Christ:

We believe that the coming of our Lord is to be personal and pre-millenial, also that it is imminent. We must distinguish between the Rapture—His coming in the air to receive his saints, which may occur at any moment, and the Revelation—His coming down to earth with His saints, the latter of which will not occur until after the gathering of Israel, the manifestation of Antichrist, and other prophesied events. Ezek. 36:24, 37:21; Matt. 24:27; 25:13; 26-29; Acts 1:9-11; I Thess. 4:14-17; II Thess. 2:8-10; Rev. 19:20; 20:4; 22:12

=== Latter Day Saint movement ===
The standard works of the largest denomination in the Latter Day Saint movement, the Church of Jesus Christ of Latter-day Saints (LDS Church), say that Christ will return, as stated in the Bible. They also teach that

When the Savior comes again, He will come in power and glory to claim the earth as His kingdom. His Second Coming will mark the beginning of the Millennium. The Second Coming will be a fearful, mournful time for the wicked, but it will be a day of peace for the righteous.

The LDS Church and its leaders do not now make predictions of the actual date of the Second Coming. Leaders have made such commentary or speculation in the past, particularly before ca. 1900, but such statements may not necessarily be regarded today as doctrinal or significant.

Latter-day Saints have particularly distinct and specific interpretations of what are considered signs of the Second Coming as stated in the Book of Revelation. According to LDS Church teachings, the restored gospel will be taught in all parts of the world prior to the Second Coming. Church members believe that there will be increasingly severe wars, earthquakes, hurricanes, and other man-made and natural disasters prior to the Second Coming.

Mormons also believe Jesus appeared to his "new world disciples" in the Americas sometime after his crucifixion. This is a central tenet of the religion.

=== Seventh-day Adventists ===
Fundamental Belief #25 of the Seventh-day Adventist Church states:

The second coming of Christ is the blessed hope of the church, the grand climax of the gospel. The Saviour's coming will be literal, personal, visible, and worldwide. When He returns, the righteous dead will be resurrected, and together with the righteous living will be glorified and taken to heaven, but the unrighteous will die. The almost complete fulfillment of most lines of prophecy, together with the present condition of the world, indicates that Christ's coming is imminent. The time of that event has not been revealed, and we are therefore exhorted to be ready at all times.

=== Jehovah's Witnesses ===
Jehovah's Witnesses rarely use the term "second coming", preferring the term "presence" as a translation of parousia. They believe that Jesus' comparison of "the presence of the Son of man" with "the days of Noah" at Matthew 24:37–39 and Luke 17:26–30 suggests a duration rather than a moment of arrival. They also believe that biblical chronology points to 1914 as the start of Christ's "presence", which continues until the final battle of Armageddon. Other biblical expressions they correlate with this period include "the time of the end" (Daniel 12:4), "the conclusion of the system of things" (Matthew 13:40, 49; 24:3) and "the last days" (2 Timothy 3:1; 2 Peter 3:3). Witnesses believe Christ's millennial reign begins after Armageddon.

=== Emanuel Swedenborg and the New Church ===
Emanuel Swedenborg, an 18th-century scientist turned theologian, taught that his time (that historians have called the Age of Enlightenment) was an age of darkness and doubt for the Christian church. Historian Marguerite Beck Block writes,

Now therefore it was time for a new church to be founded upon the earth, and for this purpose it was necessary for the Lord Himself to make his Second Coming to the sons of men.

"The night is followed by a morning which is the coming of the Lord. ... The prevailing opinion in the churches at the present day is, that when the Lord shall come for the last judgment. He will appear in the clouds of heaven with angels and the sound of trumpets, etc.," but this opinion is erroneous. The Second Coming of the Lord is not a coming in person, but in spirit and in the Word, which is from Him, and is Himself. ... Heretofore it has not been known that 'the clouds of heaven' mean the Word in the sense of the letter, and that the 'glory and power' in which He is then to come, mean the spiritual sense of the Word, because no one as yet has had the least conjecture that there is a spiritual sense in the Word, such as this sense is in itself. But as the Lord has now opened to me the spiritual sense of the Word, and has granted me to be associated with angels and spirits in their world as one of them, it is now disclosed.

... This Second Coming of the Lord is effected by means of a man to whom the Lord has manifested Himself in Person, and whom He has filled with His Spirit, that he may teach the doctrines of the New Church from the Lord by means of the Word. ... That the Lord manifested Himself before me. His servant, and sent me to this office, ... I affirm in truth."

=== Esoteric Christian teachings ===
In Max Heindel's teaching, there is a distinction between the cosmic Christ, or Christ without, and the Christ within. According to this tradition, the Christ within is regarded as the true Saviour who needs to be born within each individual in order to evolve toward the future Sixth Epoch in the Earth's etheric plane, that is, toward the "new heavens and a new earth": the New Galilee. The Second Coming or Advent of the Christ is not in a physical body, but in the new soul body of each individual in the etheric plane of the planet where man "shall be caught up in the clouds to meet the Lord in the air." The "day and hour" of this event is not known. The esoteric Christian tradition teaches that first there will be a preparatory period as the Sun enters Aquarius, an astrological concept, by precession: the coming Age of Aquarius.

== Islam ==
=== Traditional view ===
In Islam, Jesus (or Isa; Arabic: عيسى ʿĪsā) is considered to be a Messenger of God and the māsih (messiah) who was sent to guide banī isrā'īl (the Israelites) with a new scripture, the Injīl (Gospel of God (see Mark 1:14-15). The belief in Jesus (and all other messengers of God) is required in Islam, and a requirement of being a Muslim. It is noteworthy, that Muslims believe that Jesus was never crucified or resurrected, but Allah ascended him directly into heaven. Additionally, they do not recognize Jesus as the Son of God, as they believe God has no equals, but rather that he was a prophet. The Quran states that Jesus was born of the Virgin Mary. Muslims believe that Jesus performed all the miracles in the Gospels (with God's permission). The pertinent verses in Sura An-Nisa 4:157 reads "And for their saying, 'Indeed, we have killed the Messiah, Jesus, the son of Mary, the messenger of Allah.' And they did not kill him, nor did they crucify him; but another was made to resemble him to them. And indeed, those who differ over it are in doubt about it. They have no knowledge of it except the following of assumption. And they did not kill him, for certain." 4:158 continues "rather, Allah raised him to Himself. And ever is Allah Exalted in Might and Wise."

The Quran refers to a conversation between Jesus and God on judgement day in Sura Al-Ma'idah 5:116, 5:117. Jesus is questioned 5:116 "Did you ever ask the people to worship you and your mother as gods besides Allah?" To which Jesus replies 5:117 "I never told them anything except what You ordered me to say: "Worship Allah—my Lord and your Lord!" And I was witness over them as long as I remained among them."

And ˹on Judgment Day˺ Allah will say, "O Jesus, son of Mary! Did you ever ask the people to worship you and your mother as gods besides Allah?" He will answer, "Glory be to You! How could I ever say what I had no right to say? If I had said such a thing, you would have certainly known it. You know what is ˹hidden˺ within me, but I do not know what is within You. Indeed, You ˹alone˺ are the Knower of all unseen. 5:116

I never told them anything except what You ordered me to say: "Worship Allah—my Lord and your Lord!" And I was witness over them as long as I remained among them. But when You took me, You were the Witness over them—and You are a Witness over all things. 5:117

In the Quran, the second coming of Jesus is heralded in Sura Az-Zukhruf as a sign of the Day of Judgment.

And (Jesus) shall be a Sign (for the coming of) the Hour (of Judgment): therefore have no doubt about the (Hour), but follow ye Me: this is a Straight Way. 43:61

Ibn Kathir presents this verse as proof of Jesus' second coming in the Quran in his exegesis Tafsir al-Qur'an al-Azim.

There are also hadiths that foretell Jesus' future return such as: Sahih al-Bukhari, Volume 3, Book 43: Kitab-ul-`Ilm (Book of Knowledge), Hadith Number 656:

Allah's Messanger said, "The Hour will not be established until the son of Mary (i.e. Jesus) descends amongst you as a just ruler, he will break the cross, kill the pigs, and abolish the Jizya tax. Money will be in abundance so that nobody will accept it (as charitable gifts).

The Umayyad Mosque in Damascus, where according to Islamic tradition Jesus will appear close to the Day of Judgment

According to Islamic tradition, Jesus' descent will be in the midst of wars fought by the Mahdi (lit. 'the rightly guided one'), known in Islamic eschatology as the redeemer of Islam, against the al-Masih ad-Dajjal (lit. 'the false messiah', synonymous with the Antichrist) and his followers. Jesus will descend at the point of a white minaret, east of Damascus, dressed in saffron robes—his head anointed. He will then join the Mahdi in his war against the Dajjal. Jesus, considered in Islam as a Muslim (one who submits to God) and one of God's messengers, will abide by the Islamic teachings. Eventually, Jesus will slay the Antichrist Dajjal, and then everyone from the People of the Book (ahl al-kitāb, referring to Jews and Christians) will believe in him. Thus, there will be one community. Sahih Muslim, 41:7023

After the death of the Mahdi, Jesus will assume leadership. This is a time associated in Islamic narrative with universal peace and justice. Islamic texts also allude to the appearance of Ya'juj and Ma'juj (Gog and Magog), ancient tribes that will disperse and cause disturbance on earth. God, in response to Jesus' prayers, will kill them by sending a type of worm in the napes of their necks. Jesus' rule is said to be around forty years, after which he will die (since according to Islam, Jesus did not die on the cross but was taken up to heaven and continues to live until his return in the second coming). Muslims will then perform the Salat al-Janazah (funeral prayer) for him and bury him in the city of Medina in a grave left vacant beside Muhammad.

=== Ahmadiyya ===
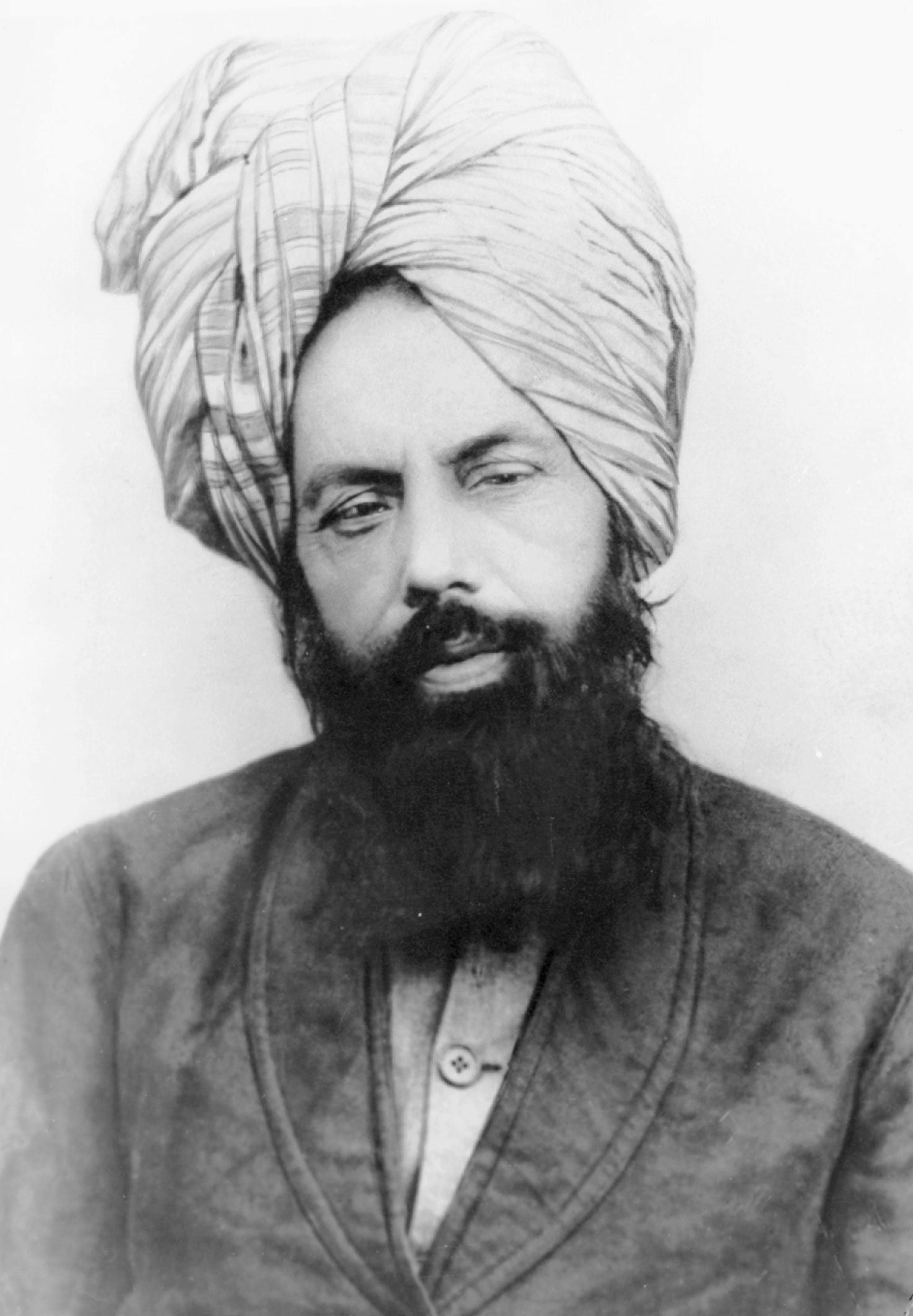
Mirza Ghulam Ahmad in 1897

The Ahmadiyya movement believe that the promised Mahdi and Messiah arrived in the person of Mirza Ghulam Ahmad (1835–1908). This is widely rejected by other Muslim sects, some of whom do not regard Ahmadis as a legitimate sect of Islam.

The Ahmadiyya movement interpret the Second Coming of Jesus prophesied as being that of a person "similar to Jesus" (mathīl-i ʿIsā) and not his physical return, in the same way as John the Baptist resembled the character of the biblical prophet Elijah in Christianity. Ahmadis believe that Mirza Ghulam Ahmad (the founder of the movement) demonstrated that the prophecy in Muslim and Christian religious texts were traditionally misunderstood to suggest that Jesus of Nazareth himself would return, and hold that Jesus survived the crucifixion and later died a natural death. Ahmadis consider Ahmad, in both his character and teachings, to be the representative of Jesus, and that he attained the same spiritual rank of Prophethood as Jesus. Thus, Ahmadis believe this prediction was fulfilled and continued by his movement.

== Baháʼí Faith ==
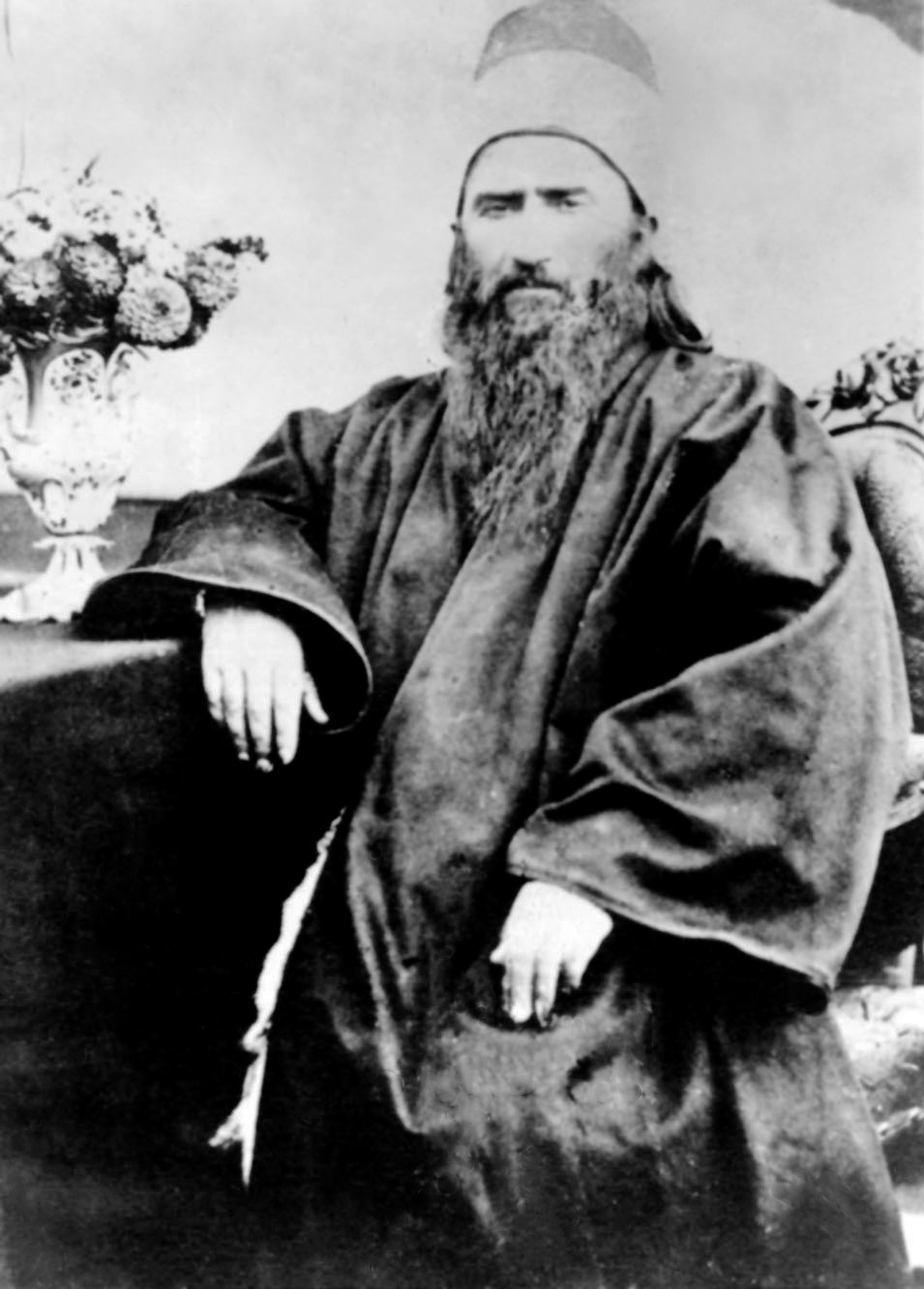
Bahá'u'lláh in 1868

According to the Baháʼí Faith, the Second Coming is a gradual process that coincides with the advancement of human civilization from the beginning of humanity. It teaches that the founders of the major world religions each represent a return of the Word and Spirit of God as a new, unique personification sent by God, who introduces new teachings, laws and revelations, such that all major religions are part of a progressive revelation. Each Coming is said to build upon the major world religions emerging from earlier ages, verifying previous spiritual truths, and fulfilling its prophesies regarding a future return or coming. In this context, the Second Coming is depicted as a continuation of God's will in one continuous faith, with different names as presented by the founders of each religion as the voice of God at different times in history.

Bahá'u'lláh announced that he was a manifestation of the returned Christ, understood as a reappearance of the Word and Spirit of God:

O thou who art waiting, tarry no longer, for He is come. Behold His Tabernacle and His Glory dwelling therein. It is the Ancient Glory, with a new Manifestation.

He wrote to Pope Pius IX,

He Who is the Lord of Lords is come overshadowed with clouds... He, verily, hath again come down from Heaven even as He came down from it the first time. Beware that thou dispute not with Him even as the Pharisees disputed with Him without a clear token or proof.

He referred to himself as the Ancient of Days and the Pen of Glory, and also claimed:

This is the Father foretold by Isaiah, and the Comforter concerning Whom the Spirit had covenanted with you. Open your eyes, O concourse of bishops, that ye may behold your Lord seated upon the Throne of might and glory.

Baha'u'llah also wrote,

Say: We, in truth, have given Ourself as a ransom for your own lives. Alas, when We came once again, We beheld you fleeing from Us, whereat the eye of My loving-kindness wept sore over My people."

Followers of the Baháʼí Faith believe that prophecies of the second coming of Jesus (along with prophecies from other religions) were fulfilled by his forerunner the Báb in 1844 and then by the events occurring during the days of Bahá'u'lláh. They believe that the fulfillment of Christian prophecies by Baha'u'llah is similar to Jesus' fulfillment of Jewish prophecies, where in both cases people were expecting the literal fulfillment of apocalyptic statements that led to rejections of the Return, instead of accepting fulfillment in symbolic and spiritual ways. Baháʼís understand that the return of the Christ with a new name was intended by Jesus to be a Return in a spiritual sense, due to Jesus explaining in the Gospels that the return of Elijah in John the Baptist was a return in a spiritual sense.

== Judaism ==
Judaism teaches that Jesus is one of the false Jewish Messiah claimants because he failed to fulfill any Messianic prophecies, which include:

1. Build the Third Temple (Ezekiel 37:26–28).
2. Gather all Jews back to the Land of Israel (Isaiah 43:5–6).
3. Usher in an era of world peace, and end all hatred, oppression, suffering and disease. As it says: "Nation shall not lift up sword against nation, neither shall man learn war anymore." (Isaiah 2:4)
4. Spread universal knowledge of the God of Israel, which will unite humanity as one. As it says: "God will be King over all the world―on that day, God will be One and His Name will be One" (Zechariah 14:9).

Regarding the Christian idea that these prophecies will be fulfilled during a "second coming," Ohr Samayach states "we find this to be a contrived answer, since there is no mention of a second coming in the Jewish Bible. Second, why couldn't God accomplish His goals the first time round?" Rabbi David Wolpe believes that the Second Coming was "grown out of genuine disappointment. [...] When Jesus died, true believers had to theologically compensate for the disaster."

== Rastafari ==
In the early developments of the Rastafari religion, Haile Selassie (the Ethiopian Emperor) was regarded as a member of the House of David, is worshipped as God incarnate, and is thought to be the "black Jesus" and "black messiah" – the second coming of Christ. It was claimed that Marcus Garvey preached the coming of the black messiah on the eve of Selassie's coronation. Due to this prophecy, Selassie was the source of inspiration of the poor and uneducated Christian populations of Jamaica, who believed that the Emperor would liberate the black people from the subjugation of European colonists.

== Paramahansa Yogananda's commentary ==
In modern times some traditional Indian religious leaders have moved to embrace Jesus as an avatar, or incarnation, of God. In light of this, the Indian guru Paramahansa Yogananda, author of Autobiography of a Yogi, wrote an extensive commentary on the Gospels published in 2004 as a two-volume set: The Second Coming of Christ: The Resurrection of the Christ Within You. The book offers a mystical interpretation of the Second Coming in which it is understood to be an inner experience, something that takes place within the individual heart. In the introduction of this book, Yogananda wrote that the true Second Coming is the resurrection within you of the Infinite Christ Consciousness. Also stated in the Book of Luke – "Neither shall they say, Lo here! or, lo there! for, behold, the kingdom of God is within you." (Luke 17:21)

== In modern culture ==
Jesus Christ returning to earth has been a theme in several movies and books.

- The Seventh Sign – 1988 film starring Demi Moore about a pregnant lady who discovers the Second Coming of Christ has rented a room from her, in order to begin the countdown that will trigger the Apocalypse.
- Left Behind – Film and book franchise (1995–mid 2010s) built by Tim LaHaye and Jerry B. Jenkins based on the time-period before, during and after the Second Coming of Christ.
- Thief In the Night by William Bernard Sears – Non-fictional book about identifying clues and symbols from the Biblical prophecies of the return of the Christ that have been overlooked or misunderstood, which concludes that Baháʼu'lláh fulfilled the prophecies (2002) [1961]. Oxford, UK: George Ronald. ISBN 0-85398-008-X.
- SCARS: Christian Fiction End-Times Thriller by Patience Prence – 2010 novel about a girl named Becky who struggles through the time of the Great Tribulation.
- At the End of All Things by Stony Graves – 2011 novel about the days following the Rapture, and right before the Final War between God and Satan.
- The Second Coming: A Love Story by Scott Pinsker – 2014 novel about two men who claim to be the Second Coming of Christ. Each claims that the other is a liar – but only one is telling the truth.
- Black Jesus – Adult Swim television series (2014–2015 and 2019) created by Aaron McGruder and Mike Clattenburg, tells the story of Jesus living in modern-day Compton, California, and his efforts to spread love and kindness on a daily basis. He is supported in his mission by a small-but-loyal group of downtrodden followers, while facing conflicts involving corrupt preachers, ethnic tensions, and the hate spreading activities of the manager of his apartment complex.
- Good Omens – TV series and book franchise. The Second Coming is the focus of the 90 minute finale episode.
- Christ Landed in Grodno, a historical fantasy novel by Belarusian writer Uladzimir Karatkievich, first published in 1972. The novel is a drama with elements of comedy, a travesty on the Second Coming: a drop-out student, while traveling with a bunch of twelve wandering actors, by a weird coincidence of circumstances is taken for Jesus by Belarusian folk.

== See also ==
- False prophet
- Inaugurated eschatology
- List of messiah claimants
- List of people claimed to be Jesus
- Life of Jesus in the New Testament
- Mahdi
- Realized eschatology
- "The Second Coming" (poem), by William Butler Yeats

== Bibliography ==
- C. S. Lewis. (1960). The World's Last Night and Other Essays. Harcourt Brace Jovanovich. ISBN 0-15-698360-5.
- Max Heindel. How Shall We Know Christ at His Coming?, May 1913 (stenographic report of a lecture, Los Angeles, California), ISBN 0-911274-64-2.
- Markus Mühling. Grundinformation Eschatologie. Systematische Theologie aus der Perspektive der Hoffnung, Vandenhoeck & Ruprecht, Göttingen 2007, ISBN 978-3-525-03619-8, pp. 221–241.
- James Stuart Russell. The Parousia, A Careful Look at the New Testament Doctrine of the Lord's Second Coming, London, England 1887.
- Emanuel Swedenborg. The Consummation of the Age; the Coming of the Lord; and the New Heaven and New Church, Chapter 14 in The True Christian Religion Containing the Universal Theology of The New Church Foretold by the Lord in Daniel 7; 13, 14; and in Revelation 21; 1, 2 (Swedenborg Foundation 1952).
- Henry Wansbrough. The New Jerusalem Bible (1990). Doubleday. ISBN 0-385-14264-1.
- Paramahansa Yogananda. The Second Coming of Christ: The Resurrection of the Christ Within You. Self-Realization Fellowship, 2004. ISBN 978-0876125557.
