= Church of Corinth =

Early Christian community in the Roman colony of Corinth

The Church of Corinth was an early Christian community founded by Paul the Apostle during an eighteen-month stay in the Roman colony of Corinth c. AD 50. Meeting as a city-wide congregation in multiple households, it drew members from varied social backgrounds.

Paul's correspondence addresses tensions over status and conduct at shared meals, participation in food associated with idols, and the use of charismatic speech, presenting the community as the "body of Christ" gathered for edification. The church's wider significance is indicated by the late-first-century Roman letter known as 1 Clement, which was sent to Corinth and continued to be read there.

In late antiquity, Corinth became a metropolitan see traditionally linked to Paul, with archaeological and literary evidence marking a shift from domestic gatherings to monumental churches in the civic center. The Church of Corinth is chiefly known through the New Testament's First and Second Epistles to the Corinthians.

== Background ==
Roman Corinth was re-established on the ruins of the destroyed Greek city as a colony under Julius Caesar and quickly recovered its strategic significance. In 44 BC it was refounded as a Roman colony, though culturally it remained a Greek city while adopting Roman architecture.

The colony's population was mixed and mobile. Greek functioned as the everyday language, with an unusually high proportion of Latin names in Paul's circle; by the early second century AD, Greek was again the city's official language. Latin predominated in formal contexts such as courts, while Greek remained common in street commerce.

Corinth's position on the isthmus between the Saronic and Corinthian gulfs fostered trade and transit, and prosperity increased between the reigns of Augustus and Nero. In earlier periods the city rapidly became a chief trading center in Greece. Everyday movement of goods and people is often illustrated by the Diolkos, a paved haulway across the isthmus, and by busy quays handling amphorae, tolls, and early-morning trade.

The urban and religious landscape under Rome combined traditional Greco-Roman cults with a strong imperial presence. A prominent marker is Temple E, probably built under Claudius at the southwest corner of the forum, together with numerous imperial altars, statue bases, and coin types. The civic calendar was punctuated by the biennial Isthmian Games, which drew visitors, temporary housing, and commerce around the Poseidon sanctuary.

Archaeology attests a Jewish community in late antique layers, consistent with a longstanding synagogue presence. Finds include a theater-area capital carved with menorahs, palm branches (lulav), and citron (etrog), generally taken to derive from a synagogue.

After the Roman sack of 146 BC, the rebuilt city followed a Roman urban plan while Greek language and culture remained dominant; Latin served legal functions and Greek most others.

== Origins and founding (c. 50–52 AD) ==
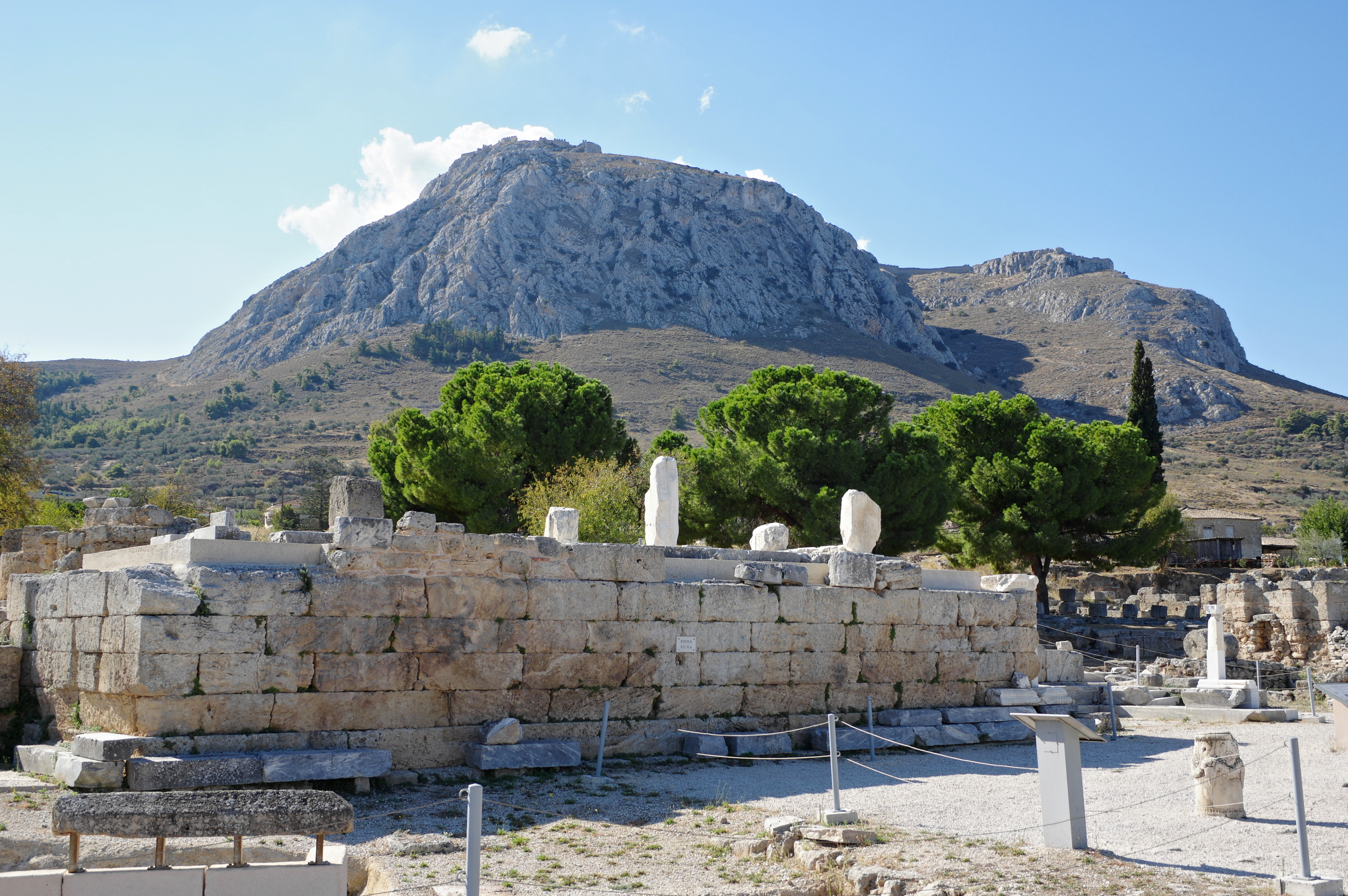
The Bema tribunal, site of Paul's hearing before the proconsul Gallio (Acts 18:12–17)

According to Acts 18:1–18, the Christian community at Corinth was founded by Paul during his second journey. He arrived from Athens, worked at tentmaking with Aquila and Priscilla, began in the synagogue and then turned to a largely gentile audience after opposition, and remained about eighteen months (Acts 18:11). The stay is commonly anchored to the proconsulship of Gallio (c. 51–52 AD), which provides the principal chronological fixed point for Paul's time in Achaea.

On this chronology, an eighteen-month ministry falls around 50/51–52 AD. Provincial conditions included pressure on the grain supply and the appointment at Corinth of a curator annonae; an inscription records Tiberius Claudius Dinippus in that role on multiple occasions, with one tenure plausibly dated to 51 AD. These circumstances are often adduced as background to the "present distress" in 1 Cor 7.

From the outset the congregation met in private dwellings and shared meals as part of its assemblies. First Corinthians 11:17–34 presupposes a domestic setting, attention to table practice, and traditions handed on during Paul's stay, while the letter reflects tensions along lines of status and education that surfaced in corporate worship.

After the founding phase, Apollos visited and assisted the local believers (Acts 18:27–19:1). First Corinthians identifies carriers and emissaries who linked Paul and the assemblies, Stephanas, Fortunatus, and Achaicus (1 Cor 16:15–18), and envisages delegates for the Jerusalem collection; in the next stage Titus coordinated communication and travel related to Corinth (2 Cor 7–8).

Slogans in 1 Cor 1:10–12 ("I am of Paul… Apollos… Cephas… Christ") are generally taken to reflect differing emphases rather than fixed factions; the passage rejects status-based boasting and reasserts common allegiance. Subsequent analysis situates this rhetoric within conventions of honor, rivalry, and reciprocity in the city, which continued to shape relations across later visits and letters (1 Cor 1–4; 2 Cor).

== Composition and social setting ==
Modern scholarship generally reconstructs the Corinthian congregation as socially mixed, with a minority of high-status members and a larger number from modest backgrounds, including slaves; tensions visible at the common meal reflect these inequalities. In the broader civic setting, Corinth's leadership culture prized status display, benefaction, rhetorical prowess, and public litigation-patterns that formed the social environment converts brought with them into the assembly.

Evidence for socially prominent participants is balanced by scholarly caution about their proportion within the congregation. Case studies of legal practices, household dining customs, and the Lord's Supper indicate that a minority of members likely belonged to the civic elite (e.g., household heads who could host larger gatherings), but most did not, and dining conventions help explain the divisions addressed in 1 Cor 11. Clarke's socio-historical synthesis of Corinth's municipal life (magistracies, council, benefaction) offers a framework for understanding why honor and rank became salient pressures within the congregation.

Slaves and dependents formed part of the community, alongside free artisans and traders, with household composition shaping participation and influence. Status was also expressed through education and rhetorical ability. Analyses of 1 Corinthians identify an educated subgroup whose expectations about speech and wisdom contributed to conflict, in a city where rhetorical training signalled rank and prestige.

Patronage networks provided the social scaffolding for leadership and assembly life. Prosopographical and sociological readings portray the "typical" believer as a free artisan or small trader, while wealthier members furnished meeting space and resources and could function as patrons; possible officeholders such as Erastus, if correctly identified, illustrate links between the congregation and civic structures. Clarke underlines that such patterns mirror the colony's honor economy, in which elite benefactors gained visibility and leverage through service and expenditure.

== Leadership and organization ==
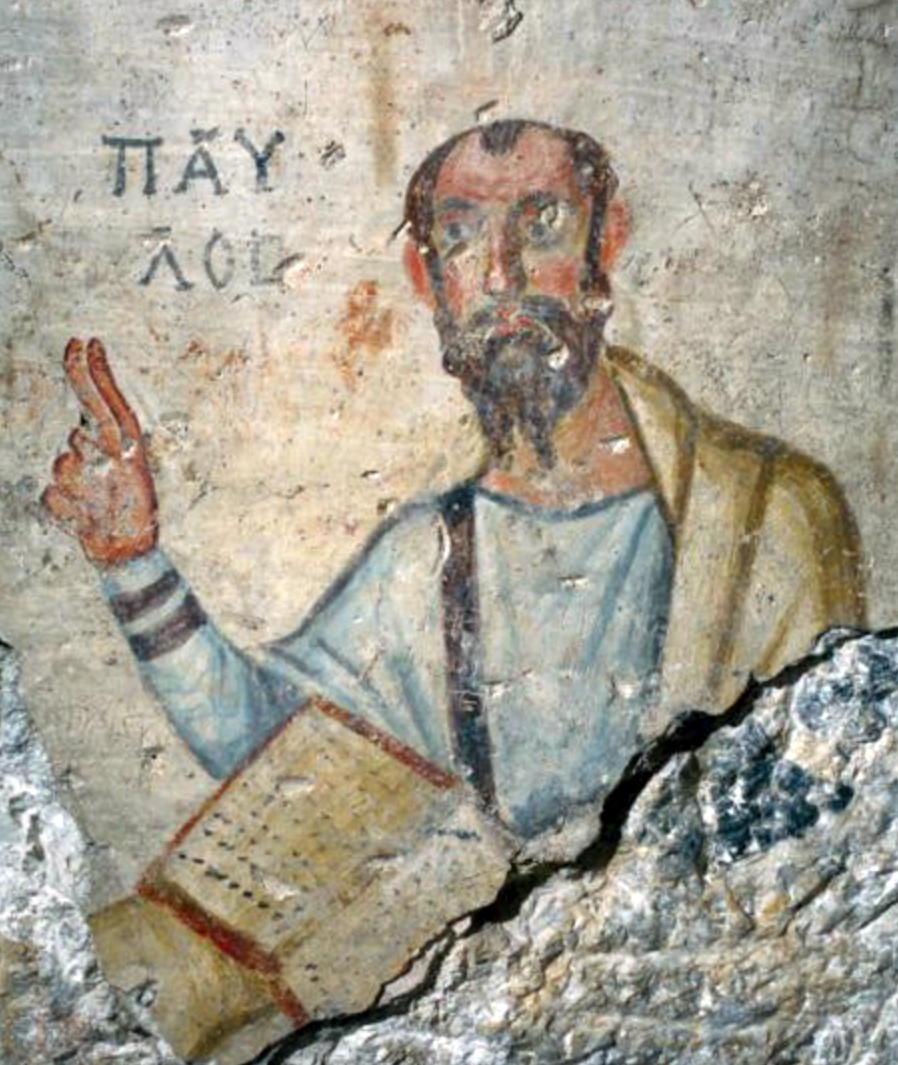
Paul

Apollos

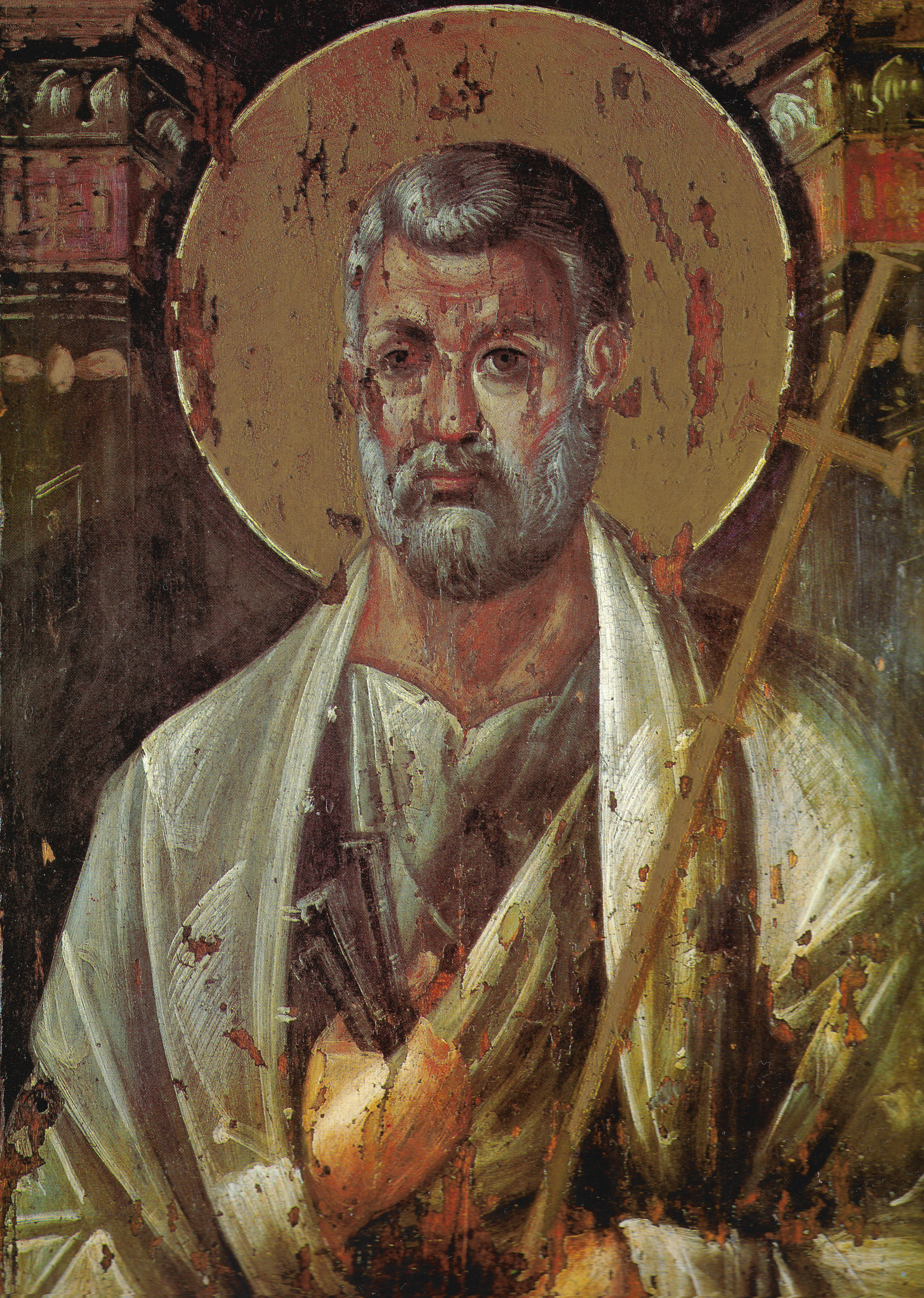
Cephas

Leadership in Corinth often followed common Greco-Roman patronage patterns, and Paul challenged loyalty to well-known leaders (such as Apollos and Cephas) as a form of status-seeking drawn from civic culture, and he warned that social standing could not excuse serious wrongdoing within the community.

When read against Corinth's civic structures, magistrates (such as duoviri and aediles), councilors (decuriones), and the expectations of euergetism, 1 Corinthians 1–4 can be understood as reframing leadership away from honor competition toward service. Thus, recent scholarship situates Paul's rhetoric within a contested process of constructing effective leadership in Corinth.

In opposition to status-based leadership, Paul presented a network of co-workers whose legitimacy rested on service rather than social position. He commended Timothy as a faithful imitator who would "remind" the church of Paul's practices, and urged recognition of the household of Stephanas for their devoted service as exemplars of leadership through labor rather than rank. In a city where eloquence and public performance conferred prestige, Paul modeled leadership that both aligned with and challenged contemporary ideals, prioritizing communal edification over personality-centered dynamics.

Paul characterized leaders as "servants" (diakonoi) and "stewards" (oikonomoi), employing planting and building metaphors to emphasize that while tasks differed, "God gives the growth," thereby directing attention from individual personalities toward accountability before God. A socio-rhetorical analysis of 1 Corinthians 3:5–9 argues that the passage supports a group-centered pattern, featuring multiple laborers, moderated leadership, and emphasis on divine agency, rather than leader-centered models.

Paul directed that internal community disputes be settled "before the saints" rather than in civic courts where litigation could enhance elite reputation, and assigned the gathered assembly authority to exclude and restore offenders for the sake of communal integrity. When interpreted within broader leadership theory and social-identity dynamics, Corinth's debates appear as a normative leadership contest in which Paul offered an alternative vision, both socially and theologically constructed, in opposition to local and itinerant competitors.

A later Corinthian leadership crisis, reflected in 1 Clement (c. AD 96), demonstrates continuity in how identity was shaped by leaders: both Paul and the Roman author functioned as what scholars term "entrepreneurs of identity," selectively retelling scriptural exempla to stabilize leadership and behavior during conflict.

== Worship and practices ==
=== Meeting spaces and the Lord's Supper ===
Early assemblies at Corinth met in domestic space and functioned as a city-wide network of house gatherings. The Lord's Supper was celebrated within a shared meal when the church "came together," but status distinctions and private dining could fracture the corporate act (1 Cor 11:17–34).

Food offered to idols posed recurring practical questions. Paul differentiates between eating in a temple precinct, at private banquets, and food purchased in the market (1 Cor 8:10; 10:25–30). Local cults help explain these contexts: sanctuaries such as the Asklepieion and the Demeter-Kore precinct contained multiple banqueting rooms, and documentary parallels preserve invitations to dine "at a banquet of the Lord Sarapis," illustrating sacrificial meals as shared participation with a deity.

=== Charismatic worship and glossolalia ===
Charismatic speech was framed by concerns for intelligibility, edification, and order (1 Cor 12–14). Comparisons with mystery-cult ecstasy in the region are noted in scholarship, but direct derivation for Christian glossolalia is not demonstrated; the letters treat it within congregational regulation.

=== Temple imagery and communal identity ===
Temple imagery shaped how the congregation understood itself. When Paul calls the church God's temple, he provides a framework for communal holiness, separation from idolatry, and disciplined behavior. Some scholars propose that this temple motif constitutes a comprehensive "mission program," but this view is treated cautiously and often limited to rhetorical and ecclesial functions.

=== Other liturgical practices ===
In the Corinthian assembly, women prayed and prophesied with an appropriate head covering while men prayed uncovered (1 Cor 11:2–16), a practice that marked Christian worship as distinctive in a mixed Greco-Roman setting. Paul notes that the wearing of the head covering by women was a feature of all Christian churches.

Other elements of congregational life include baptismal incorporation (1 Cor 1:13–17; 12:13), systematic giving for the Jerusalem collection (1 Cor 16:1–2), and the circulation and public reading of letters. The Roman church's 1 Clement was sent toward the end of the first century and, according to later testimony, continued to be read in Corinth well into the second century, evidencing sustained habits of epistolary exchange and liturgical reading.

By late antiquity the locus of worship shifted from scattered houses to monumental churches in the civic core. Excavation reports note that the forum's "Temple E" was levelled around the turn of the fifth century and that major public buildings were adapted to ecclesiastical functions; the so-called Julian Basilica served as a principal church and episcopal residence, indicating changes in liturgical scale and practice between the fourth and fifth centuries.

== Paul's visits, letters, and timeline ==
=== Correspondence sequence and pastoral engagement ===
Following the initial stay, subsequent interactions between Paul and the Corinthian assemblies can be traced from the letters themselves and early reconstructions. Paul defended his postponed visit as an act of pastoral consideration, intended to avoid coming harshly, and stated that he tested the community through a letter much firmer (and more successful) than 1 Corinthians (2:3–4; 7:8). After his founding visit of eighteen months, Paul continued to correspond with the church, reflecting ongoing pastoral concern amid escalating issues; reconstructions typically posit an earlier lost letter (cf. 1 Cor 5:9), the composition of 1 Corinthians from Ephesus with travel plans via Macedonia (1 Cor 16:5–9), and a subsequent "painful visit" followed by a "tearful" letter.

=== The painful visit and the severe letter ===
Between 1 Corinthians and 2 Corinthians, tensions in Corinth had intensified, likely due to external opponents. Upon Timothy's arrival, the situation prompted Paul to make what scholarship designates the "painful" visit, during which his authority was challenged by a church leader and a significant portion of the community (2 Cor. 2:1, 5–8; 7:8–13; 11:4). The visit left both sides distressed, and Paul subsequently sent a severe letter, now lost, warning of judgment and calling for repentance (2 Cor. 2:1–4; 2:3–4; 7:8–16).

=== Titus and the resolution ===
Titus, who is not mentioned in the first letter, carried the severe letter from Ephesus to Corinth and served as Paul's personal agent. Paul then proceeded to Troas for ministry, anxiously awaiting Titus's return (2 Cor. 2:12, 13; 7:5). Failing to meet Titus there, he moved on to Macedonia, where Titus finally arrived with news that the letter had prompted repentance among the majority (2 Cor. 2:12–13; 7:5–16). According to 2 Corinthians, Paul's rebuke had produced "godly sorrow," leading the Corinthians to repent and demonstrate renewed zeal and loyalty. Paul expressed consolation at this transformation and subsequently commended their readiness to believers in Macedonia, using their example to encourage generosity.

=== Communication and the collection delegation ===
Regarding the mechanics of communication and coordination, 1 Corinthians 16:13–24 indicates that this letter was conveyed either by certain visitors or by Timothy (16:10–11). For the collection stage of the relationship, Titus served as Paul's personal agent, while other envoys functioned as agents of the churches (8:23). Paul anticipated that representatives from each of the churches would accompany the collection to Jerusalem (1 Cor 16:3; cf. Acts 20:4–5). In the collection correspondence, Paul commended Titus as his "partner" and the other envoys as "apostles of the churches," a formula that resembles a letter of recommendation and may indicate that this delegation also carried Paul's letter to Corinth; the multi-person delegation served both integrity and security concerns for conveying funds.

The letter is also addressed to "all the holy people in the whole of Achaia," and Collins suggests that Christians from other towns in the province may have joined the Corinthian assembly at times, indicating that practices circulated regionally.

=== Apollos and inter-leader dynamics ===
Movements involving Apollos intersect this timeline but reflect delicate judgment. Barrett observes that interpreters who see in Apollos' disinclination to revisit Corinth (1 Cor. 16:12) a sensitivity that made him unwilling to appear even unintentionally as a rival may well be correct. Chow, reading 1 Cor 16:12 in light of the church's inquiry, notes that although Apollos declined to return to Corinth for the present, Paul had urged him strongly to do so, a clarification intended to prevent misunderstanding between Paul and the community.

=== Late antiquity and beyond ===
From late antiquity into the Byzantine period Corinth functioned as a metropolitan see for the Peloponnese and Achaia, its foundation traditionally linked to Paul and its episcopal succession attested in late-antique and medieval catalogues. Bishops of Corinth are recorded at early councils (e.g., 431; 680). Despite earthquakes in 365 and 375 and Alaric's sack in 396, the city remained an important provincial and ecclesiastical center.

After the late-4th-century shocks, the civic core was rebuilt with a reduced enceinte, and churches multiplied: at least four are attested within the late-antique city, another on Acrocorinth, and a very large 5th-century basilica at Lechaion. Archaeology also indicates evolving episcopal/monastic precincts southeast of the Forum (Panayia Field), with renovations and extensions into the 6th century.

From the later 6th–7th centuries the urban footprint contracted, with some settlement and defensive emphasis shifting upslope toward Acrocorinth; yet Corinth continued as a regional church center, later appearing as the metropolis for the theme of Hellas (late 7th c.) and, from the early 9th century, for Peloponnesos. By the 11th–12th centuries the ecclesiastical landscape comprised a dense network of parish churches, monasteries, and small shrines integrated into a reorganized city plan.

Political turnovers chiefly mattered insofar as they reshaped ecclesiastical administration and property. The Norman raid of 1147 led to losses of church wealth (e.g., the removal of an icon of St Theodore) and the displacement of local elites; recovery was partial. After the Fourth Crusade a Latin archbishopric was established at Corinth while the Orthodox hierarchy continued in exile or in parallel structures; subsequent restitutions and reassignments of the see are traced in narrative and prosopographical sources. Byzantine control was intermittently restored in the later 13th–15th centuries; the final Ottoman takeover in 1458 effectively ended the Byzantine ecclesiastical phase at Corinth.

== In scholarship ==
Modern scholars urge caution when reconstructing events in Corinth, as the evidence is limited, and remain unproven without independent support.

=== Dating anchors ===
The principal fixed point for Pauline chronology in Corinth is the proconsulship of Gallio (Acts 18:12–17), anchored by the Claudian rescript from Delphi; on standard reconstructions this places Paul's 18-month mission in Corinth around 50–52 AD and fixes the wider letter-writing sequence that follows. From this anchor, many date 1 Corinthians to the mid-50s, during Paul's subsequent time in Ephesus.

=== Cultic activity ===
==== Temple language usage ====
Comparisons with Greco-Roman cults (e.g., temple and household banquets) display the civic setting of Corinthian assemblies but are applied cautiously, since Paul frames the congregation itself as God's "temple," with holiness expressed in communal conduct. Many scholars therefore warn against pressing "temple" language into mission strategy; others note that cultic-purity concepts still shape community identity. Claims that Corinthian glossolalia derived directly from mystery-cult ecstasy are generally judged weak, as the letters are read instead as redirecting ecstatic or status-marked habits brought by converts.

Roman status hierarchies in the meal in 1 Cor 11:17–34 are often interpreted as reproducing patron–client patterns rather than functioning as a shared supper that "discerns the body," and Paul's critique targets status behavior at the gathering. In 1 Cor 12–14, "prophecy" is typically understood as intelligible speech for congregational edification, to be weighed by others within orderly worship, while glossolalia requires interpretation to benefit the assembly. On textual and contextual grounds, some defend the authenticity of 14:34–35 but delimit its scope within Paul's assumption that women pray and prophesy in assembly (11:5); others consider the verses secondary.

==== Sacred prostitution ====
Some scholars have interpreted Paul's urge for Christian women to wear veils as ensuring that they were not mistaken for prostitutes or hetairai. Part of the reason for this view lies in the anachronistic interpretation of Corinth as a 'sex-obsessed' city with prostitutes freely roaming the streets. This reconstruction rests on the claim that Roman Corinth practiced "sacred prostitution" at a sanctuary of Aphrodite, a claim derived chiefly from later readings of Strabo (Geography 8.6.20–21).

Recent reassessments argue that Strabo's notice concerns the earlier Greek city, employs terms (hierodoulai, hetairai) that do not match Paul's pornai, and nowhere describes ritual sex performed for a cult. Moreover, no administrative, epigraphic, or archaeological record corroborates such a practice in the Roman colony.

Topography and cult history likewise weigh against the view: the small summit shrine on Acrocorinth (associated with "Armed Aphrodite") was difficult to access and tied to imperial ideology; a forum temple "to Venus" yields no evidence for cultic sex; and a sanctuary of Aphrodite Melainis near the Kraneion, set in a funerary precinct, indicates mortuary, not sexual, aspects of the goddess.

Notices of Aphrodite/Venus at the ports of Kenchreai and Lechaion lack archaeological confirmation for sacred prostitution. Paul's admonition in 1 Cor 6 addresses ordinary prostitution in a bustling entrepôt rather than temple-based rites.

=== Head covering ===
==== 1 Corinthians 11:2–16 ====
The principal New Testament passage concerning head coverings during public worship is 1 Corinthians 11:2–16. In it Paul commends the Corinthians for holding to the traditions he delivered (v. 2), establishes a hierarchical ordering involving God, Christ, man, and woman (v. 3), addresses men and women who pray and prophesy (vv. 4–5), and instructs that men should pray or prophesy with uncovered heads while women should do so with covered heads (vv. 4–7). Paul appeals to the creation account in Genesis (vv. 8–9), references angels (v. 10), notes the interdependence of men and women "in the Lord" (vv. 11–12), appeals to what is "proper" and to nature regarding hair length (vv. 13–15), and concludes by stating that the churches of God have no other custom (v. 16).

Paul's head-covering directive is widely regarded as one of his most contentious passages. The primary issue is whether it enforces locally recognizable gender markers and social respectability in Corinth or establishes a transcultural norm for worship, with early Christian tradition treating it as prescriptive and most modern scholars viewing it as culturally conditioned and not directly binding. (Note: This section outlines the historical-critical, socio-historical, and lexical analysis of 1 Corinthians 11:2–16, not a theological or devotional one. For theological discussion, see Head covering for Christian women § New Testament.) The Oxford Bible Commentary describes the passage as presenting a hierarchical ordering of male and female, as highly influential yet argumentatively awkward.

==== Head and gender dynamics ====
In 1 Corinthians 11:3 the word kephalē ("head") is interpreted by many modern commentators as denoting source/origin or preeminence rather than simple hierarchical "authority over," while others maintain that it most naturally indicates authority or leadership or at least implies a hierarchical ordering. In either case it reads the chain "God, Christ, man, woman" as implying subordination. In a detailed survey of the modern debate, Lakey groups proposed metaphorical senses of kephalē under three main headings ("person in authority over," "source/point of origin," and "pre-eminent/top") and, like Marshall, concludes that Paul's premise in verse 3 articulates a hierarchical relationship from God to Christ to man to woman, even if the precise nuance of the metaphor remains disputed.

The meaning of "authority on her own head" (v. 10) continues to be debated, but Paul balances his instructions with an explicit affirmation of mutual dependence between men and women in the Lord (vv. 11–12). In the culturally mixed setting of Roman Corinth, worshippers following the traditional Roman rite (ritus Romanus) commonly prayed and sacrificed capite velato (with the toga or mantle pulled over the head). Literary and archaeological evidence documents men with covered heads in both civic and sacred contexts. Oster argues that scholars have neglected the "male issue" in this passage. He believes Paul's instruction about men "having [something] on the head" (v. 4) should be read against Roman worship practices, where priests regularly performed religious functions capite velato (with covered heads). He criticises the dismissal of a Roman contextual reading and suggests that many Roman women in Corinth would already have worn some form of covering in the assembly. By contrast, Greek and Roman art frequently depicts women praying bareheaded, making Paul's instruction distinctive. Massey similarly frames it against tensions between Greek and Roman male head-covering ideals in Corinth and examines how a veiled man would have created shame and conflict in that setting.

==== Corinthian dress ====
Biblical scholars generally hold that the historic interpretation of the passage required the wearing of an actual head covering (shawl, veil, or the himation drawn over the head) by Christian women during worship. This remains the majority view in contemporary scholarship. The wider Graeco-Roman world both men and women commonly wore the same outer garment (the himation), which could be drawn forward from the neck to cover the head or even the face, and that married women in public, in the presence of men other than close family members, often covered their heads (and sometimes faces) as a sign of modesty and a protection against lustful looks, with such veiling both differentiating women from men and signalling their subordinate status.

Roman citizen women normally appeared bareheaded in everyday public life but often drew the himation over the head in ritual contexts. Several recent studies conclude that Paul is addressing literal head coverings rather than merely hair length or style. Some scholars hold that both textile head coverings and hairstyles are regulated. (Note: Talbert reads 1 Cor 11:2–16 as addressing women who have removed their veils in worship, with vv. 4–6 speaking of a cloth covering and vv. 13–15 presupposing hair as part of the gender distinction Paul wants maintained. Finney argues that Paul’s concern for honour and shame in the Corinthian assembly operates through visible gender markers that include both veils and hair practices. Martin treats Paul’s appeal to "nature" in vv. 14–15 as an argument about hair functioning as a bodily covering alongside the earlier requirement of a veil. Sampley, in the New Interpreter’s Bible, reads the passage as dealing first with a cloth head covering (vv. 4–6) and then with hair length as a secondary, "natural" covering (vv. 13–15). Økland situates Paul’s instructions within a broader discourse on gender and sanctuary space, in which women’s veils and long hair together mark appropriate female presence in worship.) Massey rejects the "long hair only" interpretation. He argues that the Greek words katakalyptō and katà kephalēs echōn consistently mean a cloth head covering, not loose hair, a meaning confirmed by major Greek lexicons (BAGD 1957; BDAG 2000). Batten sees Paul's instructions against a Roman background where women could cover their heads with their himation during worship but were not required to veil in public. She suggests Paul is concerned with maintaining gender distinctions and may be addressing wealthy women displaying their status through elaborate, uncovered hairstyles. Finney stresses that honour and shame are key to understanding this passage. He suggests that high-status men may have worn head coverings to show their superior social position in the church.

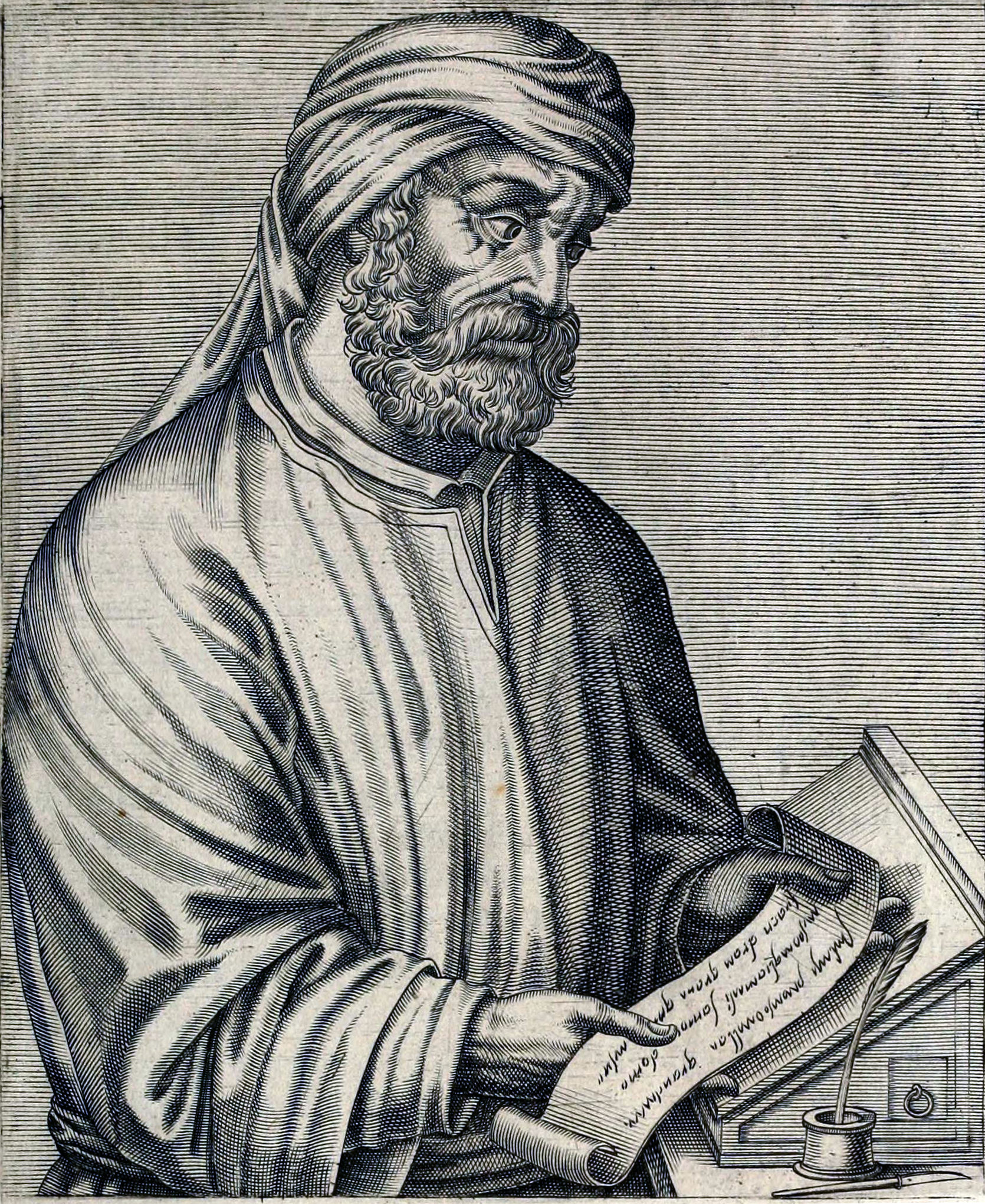
Tertullian (c. 200 AD) reports that "What the apostles taught, their disciples approve."

Commentators such as Robertson & Plummer (1914), Fitzmyer (2008), and Fee (1987) have regarded the male covering in v. 4 as largely hypothetical, introduced to highlight what they see as the real issue of unveiled women. In contrast, studies by Oster and Massey treat male veiling as an actual practice requiring historical reconstruction.

==== Church applicability ====
Many modern scholars interpret 1 Cor 11:2–16 as a context-specific regulation intended to maintain visible gender distinction, liturgical propriety, and honour within the socially diverse Corinthian assembly, deliberately differentiating Christian worship from surrounding Greco-Roman cultic and social practices. (Note: Fitzmyer emphasises liturgical propriety and gender distinction; Witherington reads the passage socio-rhetorically as reinforcing honour codes; Oster stresses Roman cultic headgear and the way differentiated practice set Christian gatherings apart; Batten connects the restrictions on female adornment to later New Testament texts (1 Tim 2:9; 1 Pet 3:3) and sees them as limiting women’s exercise of power while protecting male honour.) Although Paul's original arguments blur the line between theological principle and local custom and conclude with an appeal to the common practice of all the churches (v. 16), the earliest interpreters rapidly universalised the instruction. Patristic and medieval commentators consistently treat women's head covering as a binding norm rooted in creation order, nature, modesty, and female subordination, applicable in worship and frequently in everyday public life. (Note: For surveys of this exegesis see and . Early Christian writers across regions regularly assume or insist that Christian women appear veiled, tying the practice to broader ideals of sexual asceticism and visible separation from pagan society; .) Tertullian, writing c. 200, explicitly claims that "the Corinthians themselves understood [Paul] in this sense; for to this day the Corinthians veil their virgins," indicating local continuity of the practice into the early third century.

== See also ==
- Early Christianity
- Cenchreae

== Bibliography ==
- Ambrosiaster (2009). Commentaries on Romans and 1–2 Corinthians. Downers Grove: IVP Academic. p. 172.
- Bray, Gerald L.; Oden, Thomas C., eds. (2006). 1–2 Corinthians. Ancient Christian Commentary on Scripture. Downers Grove, IL: InterVarsity Press. pp. 103–104.
- Bailey, Kenneth E. (2011). Paul Through Mediterranean Eyes: Cultural Studies in 1 Corinthians. Downers Grove, IL: IVP Academic. p. 302.
- Barentsen, Jack (2018). "The social construction of Paul's apostolic leadership in Corinth". HTS Teologiese Studies/Theological Studies. 74 (4): a5191. doi:10.4102/hts.v74i4.5191.
- Barrett, C. K. (1964). "Christianity at Corinth". Bulletin of the John Rylands Library. 46: 270–297.
- Barrett, C. K. (1968). A Commentary on the First Epistle to the Corinthians. London: A. & C. Black. pp. 248–249.
- Barrett, C. K. (1971). The First Epistle to the Corinthians. Black's New Testament Commentaries. London: A. & C. Black. pp. 251–252.
- Héring, Jean (1962). The First Epistle of Saint Paul to the Corinthians. London: Epworth Press. p. 106.
- Hoelke, April Marie (2014). Exposed heads and exposed motives: Coverings as a means to unity at Corinth (MA thesis). Gardner–Webb University. "The majority of scholars simply contend, however, that the passage refers to head coverings."
- Barrett, C. K. (1982). Essays on Paul. London: SPCK. p. 273.
- Bercot, David W. (1992). Common Sense: A New Approach to Understanding Scripture. Scroll Publishing. pp. 67–70. ISBN 978-0-924722-06-6. "This written evidence of the course of performance of the early Christians is corroborated by the archaeological record. The pictures we have from the second and third centuries from the catacombs and other places depict Christian women praying with a cloth veil on their heads. ... The historical interpretation of 1 Corinthians 11 squarely meets this common sense principle. It gives full meaning to everything Paul has said."
- Blue, Bradley B. (1994). "The House Church at Corinth and the Lord's Supper". In Balch, David L. (ed.). Social History of the Matthean Community: Cross-Disciplinary Approaches. p. 223.
- Blue, Bradley B. (1991). "The House Church at Corinth and the Lord's Supper: Famine, Food Supply, and the "Present Distress"". Criswell Theological Review. 5 (2): 223–236.
- Bon, Antoine (1969). La Morée franque: Recherches historiques, topographiques et archéologiques sur la principauté d'Achaïe. Paris: De Boccard. pp. 162–164.
- Breytenbach, Cilliers (1986). "The Corinthian Church in the First Century A.D.—A Living Church?". Missionalia. 14 (1): 6–12.
- Brouwer, R. J. (2010). Temple Symbolism and Mission in the Pauline Letters. Leuven: Peeters. pp. 86–264.
- Brown, Amelia R. (2018). Corinth in Late Antiquity: A Greek, Roman and Christian City. London: I.B. Tauris/Bloomsbury. pp. 34–219.
- Burton, Ernest D. (1904). "The Correspondence of the Apostle Paul with the Church in Corinth". The Biblical World. 24: 284–285.
- Button, Christopher; van Rensburg, Fika J. (2003). "The House Churches in Corinth". In die Skriflig. 37 (3): 395–416.
- Cartledge, Mark J. (2015). The Holy Spirit and Public Life: Empowering Ecclesial Praxis. pp. 184–187.
- Chow, John K. (1992). Patronage and Power: A Study of Social Networks in Corinth. Sheffield: JSOT Press. pp. 40–117.
- Clarke, Andrew D. (1993). Secular and Christian Leadership in Corinth: A Socio-Historical and Exegetical Study of 1 Corinthians 1–6. Leiden: Brill. pp. 1–131.
- Collins, Raymond F. (2013). Second Corinthians. Paideia Commentaries on the New Testament. Grand Rapids: Baker Academic. pp. 25–194. ISBN 978-0-8010-3186-1.
- Duckor, Brent; Racine, Jean-François (2022). "Leading in the Time That Remains: The Passion and Complexity of Paul's Leadership in 1 Corinthians". Science et Esprit. 74 (2–3): 409–431. doi:10.7202/1088275ar.
- Dutch, Robert S. (2005). The Educated Elite in 1 Corinthians: Education and Community Conflict in Graeco-Roman Context. London: T&T Clark. pp. 3–4.
- Edsall, B. A. (2013). "Greco-Roman costume and Paul's fraught argument in 1 Corinthians 11:2–16". Journal of Greco-Roman Christianity and Judaism. 9: 132–146.
- Fee, Gordon D. (1987). The First Epistle to the Corinthians. NICNT. Grand Rapids, MI: Eerdmans. pp. 496–503.
- Finney, Mark T. (2010). "Honour, Head-coverings and Headship: 1 Corinthians 11.2–16 in Social-Scientific Perspective". Journal for the Study of the New Testament. 33 (1): 31–58.
- Fitzmyer, Joseph A. (1993). According to Paul: Studies in the Theology of the Apostle. New York: Paulist Press. pp. 80–87.
- Fitzmyer, Joseph A. (2008). First Corinthians: A new translation with introduction and commentary. Anchor Yale Bible 32. New Haven, CT: Yale University Press. pp. 412–420.
- Frye, Maddison A. (2023). "A Biblical Perspective of Group-Centered Groups in Organizations: A Socio-Rhetorical Analysis of 1 Corinthians 3:5–9". Journal of Biblical Perspectives in Leadership. 13 (1): 1–21.
- Gill, David W. J. (1990). "The Importance of Roman Portraiture for Head Coverings in 1 Corinthians 11:2–16". Tyndale Bulletin. 41 (2): 245–260.
- Gill, David W. J. (1993). "In Search of the Social Elite in the Corinthian Church". Tyndale Bulletin. 44 (2): 324–337.
- Godet, Frédéric Louis (1957). Commentary on the First Epistle to the Corinthians. Vol. II. Grand Rapids: Zondervan. p. 133.
- Gregory, Timothy E. (1991). "Corinth". In Kazhdan, A. P. (ed.). The Oxford Dictionary of Byzantium. New York: Oxford University Press.
- Grudem, Wayne (1994). "The Meaning of Kephalē ('Head'): A Response to Recent Studies". In Piper, John; Grudem, Wayne (eds.). Recovering Biblical Manhood and Womanhood. Wheaton, IL: Crossway. pp. 425–468.
- Harding, Mark (1994). "Church and Gentile Cults at Corinth". In Engberg-Pedersen, Troels (ed.). Paul in His Hellenistic Context. London: T&T Clark. pp. 205–209.
- Harding, Nick (1998). "The Church in Corinth and the Gentile Cults". In Engberg-Pedersen, T. (ed.). Paul in His Hellenistic Context. p. 220.
- Horrell, David G. (1996). The Social Ethos of the Corinthian Correspondence. Edinburgh: T&T Clark. pp. 204–205.
- House, H. Wayne (1988). "Tongues and the Mystery Religions of Corinth". Bibliotheca Sacra. 145: 134–151.
- Hurley, James B. (2002). Man and Woman in Biblical Perspective. Eugene, OR: Wipf & Stock. p. 164.
- Keener, Craig S. (1992). Paul, Women and Wives: Marriage and Women's Ministry in the Letters of Paul. Peabody, MA: Hendrickson. pp. 25–31.
- Keener, Craig S. (2005). 1–2 Corinthians. Cambridge: Cambridge University Press. pp. 7–244.
- Köstenberger, Andreas J.; Köstenberger, Margaret E. (2014). God's Design for Man and Woman: A Biblical-Theological Survey. Wheaton, IL: Crossway. pp. 170–178.
- Kovacs, Judith L. (2005). The Church's Bible: 1 Corinthians. Grand Rapids: Eerdmans. p. 180.
- Kuske, Silvia (2006). "Veil". The Brill Dictionary of Religion Online. Brill. "According to Paul (1 Cor 11:3–16), a woman is obliged to wear a veil at divine service (where she 'prays or prophesies'). As this commandment is grounded in the Hebrew Bible, it is understandable that it would inform the everyday...."
- Kujanpää, Katja (2022). "Paul and the Author of 1 Clement as Entrepreneurs of Identity in Corinthian Crises of Leadership". Journal for the Study of the New Testament. 44 (3): 368–389. doi:10.1177/0142064X211064782. hdl:10138/346521.
- Le Quien, Michel (1740). Oriens Christianus in quatuor Patriarchatus digestus. Vol. II. Paris. p. 155.
- Liu, Yulin (2013). Temple Purity in 1–2 Corinthians. Tübingen: Mohr Siebeck. pp. 1–179.
- Marshall, Jill E. (2019). "Uncovering Traditions in 1 Corinthians 11:2–16". Novum Testamentum. 61 (1): 70–87.
- Marshall, Peter (1987). Enmity in Corinth: Social Conventions in Paul's Relations with the Corinthians. Mohr Siebeck. p. 345.
- Martin, Dale B. (1995). The Corinthian Body. New Haven: Yale University Press. pp. 50–51.
- Martin, W. J. (2004). Carson, D. A.; O'Brien, P. T.; Seifrid, M. A. (eds.). Justification and Variegated Nomism, Volume 2: The Paradoxes of Paul. Grand Rapids: Baker Academic. p. 84.
- Mitchell, Brian Patrick (2019). Origen's Revenge: The Greek and Hebrew Roots of Christian Thinking on Male and Female. pp. 161–162.
- Murphy-O'Connor, Jerome (2010). "1 Corinthians 11:2–16 Once Again". Catholic Biblical Quarterly. 50 (2): 145–147.
- Økland, Jorunn (2004). Women in Their Place: Paul and the Corinthian Discourse of Gender and Sanctuary Space. London: T&T Clark. pp. 190–191.
- Oster, Richard E. (1988). "When Men Wore Veils to Worship: The Historical Context of 1 Corinthians 11.4". New Testament Studies. 34 (4): 481–505.
- Oster, Richard E. (1992). "Use, Misuse and Neglect of Archaeological Evidence in Some Modern Works on 1 Corinthians". In Lovering, E. H. (ed.). SBL 1992 Seminar Papers. Atlanta: Scholars Press. pp. 52–73.
- Padgett, Alan (1984). "Paul on Women in the Church: The Contradictions of Coiffure in 1 Corinthians 11.2–16". Journal for the Study of the New Testament. 20: 69–86.
- Payne, Philip B. (2006). 1 Corinthians 11:2–16 and the Ordination of Women. Priscilla Papers 20. pp. 4–12.
- Payne, Philip B. (2009). Man and Woman, One in Christ. Grand Rapids, MI: Zondervan. pp. 113–139.
- Payne, Philip B. (2015). Man and Woman, One in Christ: An Exegetical and Theological Study of Paul's Letters. Grand Rapids, MI: Zondervan Academic. "Most modern commentators have understood "with head uncovered" (ἀκατακαλύπτῳ τῇ κεφαλῇ) to refer to a woman not wearing a veil, shawl, or some other garment over her head (CEV) (p. 150)."
- Porter, Stanley E.; Pitts, Andrew W. (2013). Christian Origins and Greco-Roman Culture: Social and Literary Contexts for the New Testament. Leiden: Brill. pp. 579–580.
- Roebuck, Carl (1963). "Some Aspects of Urbanization in Corinth". Hesperia. 32 (1): 97.
- Sampley, J. Paul (2002). "The First Letter to the Corinthians". In Keck, Leander E. (ed.). The New Interpreter's Bible. Vol. 10. Nashville: Abingdon Press. p. 927.
- Schüssler Fiorenza, Elisabeth (1987). Bread Not Stone: The Challenge of Feminist Biblical Interpretation. Boston: Beacon Press. p. 227.
- Scranton, Robert L. (1957). Corinth: The Results of Excavations. Princeton: American School of Classical Studies at Athens. pp. 24–116.
- Spaeth, Barbette Stanley (2023). "Paul, Prostitutes, and the Cult of Aphrodite in Corinth". Biblical Archaeology Review. 49 (1): 65–68.
- Stroud, Ronald S. (1974). "Greek Inscriptions at Corinth". Hesperia. 43: 199.
- Talbert, Charles H. (2002). Reading Corinthians: A Literary and Theological Commentary. Macon, GA: Smyth & Helwys. pp. 67–68.
- Thiselton, Anthony C. (2000). The First Epistle to the Corinthians. NIGTC. Grand Rapids, MI: Eerdmans. pp. 811–1162.
- Thompson, James W. (2011). Christ and Culture in the New Testament. pp. 84–85.
- Welborn, L. L. (2005). Paul, the Fool of Christ: A Study of 1 Corinthians 1–4 in the Comic-Philosophic Tradition. T&T Clark/Sheffield Academic. pp. passim.
- Witherington III, Ben (1995). Conflict and community in Corinth: A socio-rhetorical commentary on 1 and 2 Corinthians. Grand Rapids, MI: Eerdmans. pp. 231–238.
- Witherington III, Ben (2012). A Week in the Life of Corinth. InterVarsity Press. ISBN 978-0-8308-6699-1.
- Balch, David L.; Lamoreaux, Jason T., eds. (2011). Finding a Woman’s Place: Essays in Honor of Carolyn Osiek. Princeton Theological Monograph Series. Vol. 150. Pickwick Publications.
- Garland, David E. (November 2003). First Corinthians. Baker Academic. p. 512. ISBN 978-0-8010-2630-0.
- Hays, Richard B. (1 January 2011). First Corinthians. Westminster John Knox Press. pp. 189–190. ISBN 978-0-664-23440-9. "His trump card, then, is to appeal to the custom of "the churches of God." Presumably he is referring here not only to his own mission churches but to other early Christian communities as well, including the Jewish-Christian communities that looked to Jerusalem as their spiritual leader. This final argument assumes that the Corinthians will recognize themselves as bound to respect the uniformity of practice in the other churches of the fledgling Christian movement (p. 190)."
- Wu, Rongxi (2020). The Veil in Classical Antiquity: A Sociocultural and Exegetical Study of 1 Corinthians 11:2–16. University of Sheffield. p. 19. "This study sides with the majority of commentators and takes the object of uncovering (1 Cor. 11:5) as the head-covering."
- Lambrecht, J. (1999). Second Corinthians. Liturgical Press. pp. 30–31. "2:1. For I made up my mind not to come to you again in sorrow: The textual variant de ("but"), instead of gar ("for"), although also well attested, is not to be preferred in this context. Paul's intention was not to go back to Corinth "in sorrow." The last expression probably not only refers to Paul's own sadness but also to the sorrow a new visit may cause to the Corinthians. From "not ... again" we can conclude that such a sorrowful visit has already taken place: the so-called painful (short) visit, the second (for the third, cf. 12:14 and 13:1)."
- Barton, John; Muddiman, John (2001). Barton, John; Muddiman, John (eds.). The Oxford Bible Commentary. Oxford: Oxford University Press. pp. 1125–1126. ISBN 978-0-19-875500-5.
- Batten, Alicia J. (2010). "Clothing and adornment". Biblical Theology Bulletin. 40 (3): 148–159. doi:10.1177/0146107910375547.
- Concannon, Cavan W. (2021). Assembling Early Christianity: Trade, Networks, and the Letters of Paul. Cambridge: Cambridge University Press. pp. 219–221. ISBN 978-1-108-19709-0.
- Harnack, Adolf von (1908). The Mission and Expansion of Christianity in the First Three Centuries. Vol. 2. Translated by James Moffatt. London; New York: Williams and Norgate; G. P. Putnam's Sons. pp. 149–213.
- Keener, Craig S. (2014). The IVP Bible Background Commentary: New Testament. Downers Grove, IL: IVP Academic. pp. 708–713.
- Innes, William C. (2021). Religious Hair Display and Its Meanings. Cham: Springer International Publishing. pp. 93–94. ISBN 978-3-030-69974-1.
- Massey, Preston T. (2007). "The meaning of katakalyptō and katà kephalēs echōn in 1 Corinthians 11.2–16". New Testament Studies. 53 (4): 502–523. doi:10.1017/S0028688507000252.
- Massey, Preston T. (2018). "Veiling among men in Roman Corinth: 1 Corinthians 11:4 and the potential problem of East meeting West". Journal of Biblical Literature. 137 (2): 501–517.
- Stafford, G. (2024). "Veiling and head-covering in late antiquity: Between ideology, aesthetics, and practicality". Past & Present. 263 (1): 3–46. doi:10.1093/pastj/gtad017.
- Upson-Saia, Kristi (2012). Early Christian Dress: Gender, Virtue, and Authority. Routledge Studies in Ancient History. New York: Routledge. pp. 61–69.
- Lakey, Michael J. (2010). Image and Glory of God: 1 Corinthians 11:2–16 as a Case Study in Bible, Gender and Hermeneutics. The Library of New Testament Studies. Vol. 418. London; New York: T&T Clark. p. 110.
- Robertson, Archibald; Plummer, Alfred (1914). A Critical and Exegetical Commentary on the First Epistle of St. Paul to the Corinthians. International Critical Commentary. Edinburgh: T. & T. Clark. p. 228.
