= Fortunatus =

Fortunatus is a Latin word meaning "happy, lucky, rich, blessed". A masculine given name, it can refer to:

== Saints ==
- Fortunatus the Apostle, one of the 70 Disciples of Jesus Christ, companion of Achaicus of Corinth
- Fortunatus (1st century), martyred with Orontius and Justus
- Fortunatus (died c. 70), a deacon martyred with Hermagoras of Aquileia
- Fortunatus (died 212), martyred with SS Felix and Achilleus
- Fortunatus of Casei (died 286), a martyr
- Fortunatus (died 303), a deacon martyred with SS Felix of Thibiuca, Audactus, Januarius, and Septimus
- Fortunatus of Naples, 4th century bishop of Naples
- Fortunatus of Spoleto (died 400), a priest near Montefalco
- Fortunatus of Todi (died 537), bishop of Todi
- Venantius Fortunatus (died in the early 7th century), a poet and bishop of Poitiers

== Other ==
- Fortunatus Dwarris (1786–1860), English lawyer and author
- Fortunatus Hueber (1639–1706), German Franciscan historian and theologian
- Fortunatus M. Lukanima (1940–2014), Roman Catholic bishop
- Fortunatus Nwachukwu (born 1960), Roman Catholic apostolic nuncio to various Caribbean nations
- Fortunatus Wright (1712–1757), English privateer
- Emerich Szerencsés (died 1526), known as Fortunatus, deputy treasurer of the Kingdom of Hungary and a Jewish convert to Christianity
- Heinrich Glücksmann (1864–1947), Moravian-born Austrian author who used the pseudonym Fortunatus

== Fictional characters ==
- the protagonist of Fortunatus, a German proto-novel or chapbook about a legendary hero popular in 15th- and 16th-century Europe
- the protagonist of Old Fortunatus, a 1599 play by Thomas Dekker
- a character in "King Fortunatus's Golden Wig", a French fairy tale

== See also ==
- Venantius Fortunatus (530–600), Latin poet and hymnodist, bishop and saint
- Edward Fortunatus (1565–1600), Margrave of Baden-Rodemachern and Baden-Baden
- Herman Fortunatus, Margrave of Baden-Rodemachern (1595–1665), son of Edward Fortunatus
- Publius Aelius Fortunatus, 2nd-century Roman painter
