= Kephale =

Kephalē (Greek: κεφαλή) literally means "head" in ancient Greek.

- Kephale (Attica)
- Kephale (New Testament)
- Kephale (Byzantine Empire)
