= Charlieu Abbey =

Benedictine abbey in France

Coordinates: 46°9′28″N 4°10′7″E

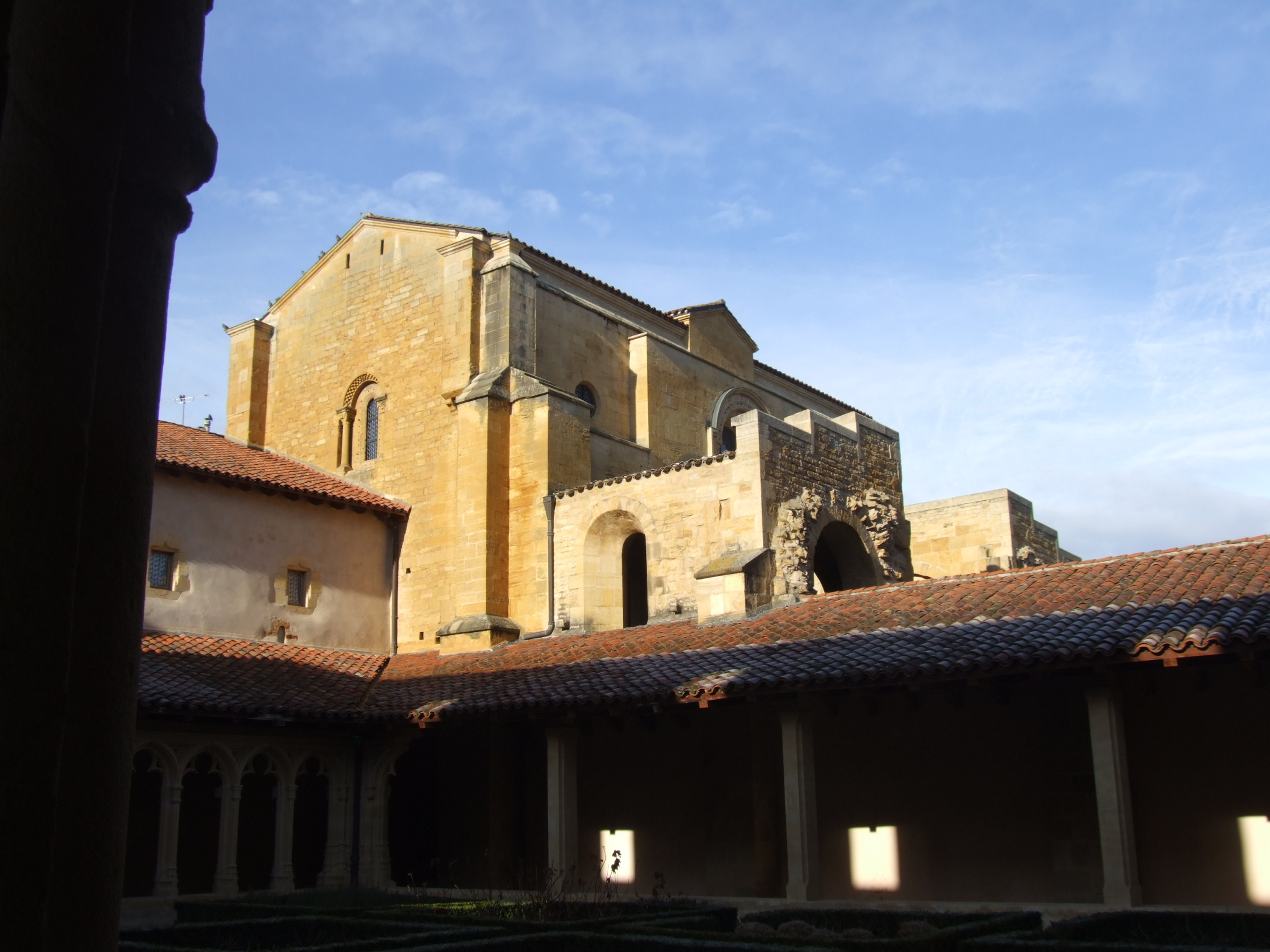
Charlieu Abbey

Charlieu Abbey or St. Fortunatus' Abbey, Charlieu (French: Abbaye de Charlieu) was a Benedictine abbey located at Charlieu, Loire, Burgundy, France. It was later a Cluniac priory.

== History ==
The monastery, dedicated to Saint Fortunatus, was founded in 872, in this region of southern Burgundy known as the Forez. Its patrons were Ratbertus, bishop of Valence, and his brother Edward, in a place they called Carus Locus ("dear place"), and dedicated to Saint Stephen and Saint Fortunatus, patron of Valence, with his co-martyrs Felix and Achilles. The abbey was placed under the direct control of the Holy See.

The tradition that the abbey church and other structures at the site were erected by Gausmar, the first abbot, and his monks with their own hands is belied by the fine and professional character of the masonry uncovered when remains of the foundations of the Carolingian abbey were uncovered at the site in 1927. Its roof was wooden, for no foundations for interior supporting piers were found. Pencil towers no more than two meters in diameter encircled the corners of its façade and its apsidal east end, which had a semi-subterranean ambulatory; semi-circular buttresses strengthened the walls at intervals.

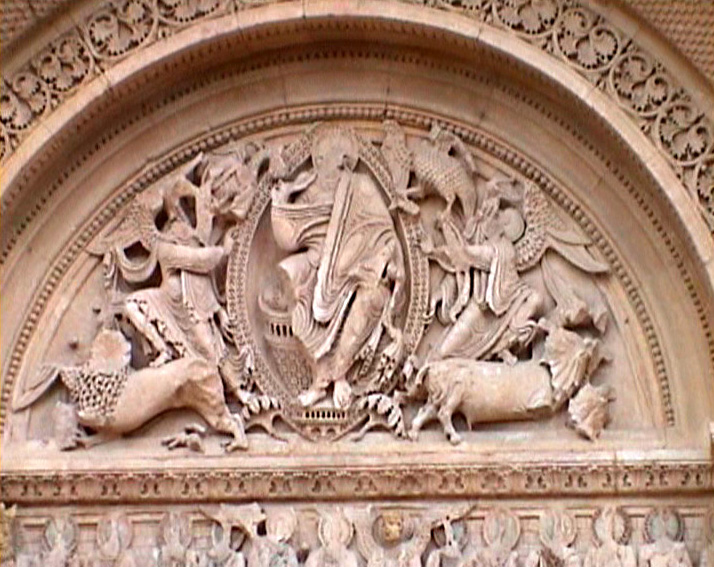
Late Romanesque tympanum: Christ in a mandorla, surrounded by the symbols of the Four Evangelists; twelfth century.

An early benefactor was Boso, Duke of Burgundy, who placed a priory in Charlieu's gift when he was crowned King of Provence (879); the abbey long claimed that Boso was buried at Charlieu. By 926 the abbey was important enough to be the seat of a synod, at which it was decided that certain alienated church properties were to be returned to the church by their lay proprietors.

The Benedictine community at Charlieu was annexed by the Cluniac movement in 932, one of Cluny's earliest acquisitions and always among the first mentioned in any list of Cluniac houses. In the eleventh century the abbot was reduced to a prior. The church was rebuilt on a somewhat expanded plan under the rule of Odilo, abbot of Cluny, in the first half of the eleventh century, in a campaign that lasted fifty years, continuing under Odilo's successor Hugh: the abbey church was consecrated in 1094. A narthex was added in the twelfth century.

The community of Charlieu refused the Cluniac reforms of the seventeenth century, and on 19 March 1787, letters patent suppressed the abbey. On 9 September 1792 a Revolutionary mob broke into the abbey's muniments room and made a bonfire of all its records. In 1795 the abbey church was sold for the value of its building materials, in two lots, of which one, comprising the narthex and westernmost bay, still stand today as a ruin; the eastern end was razed.

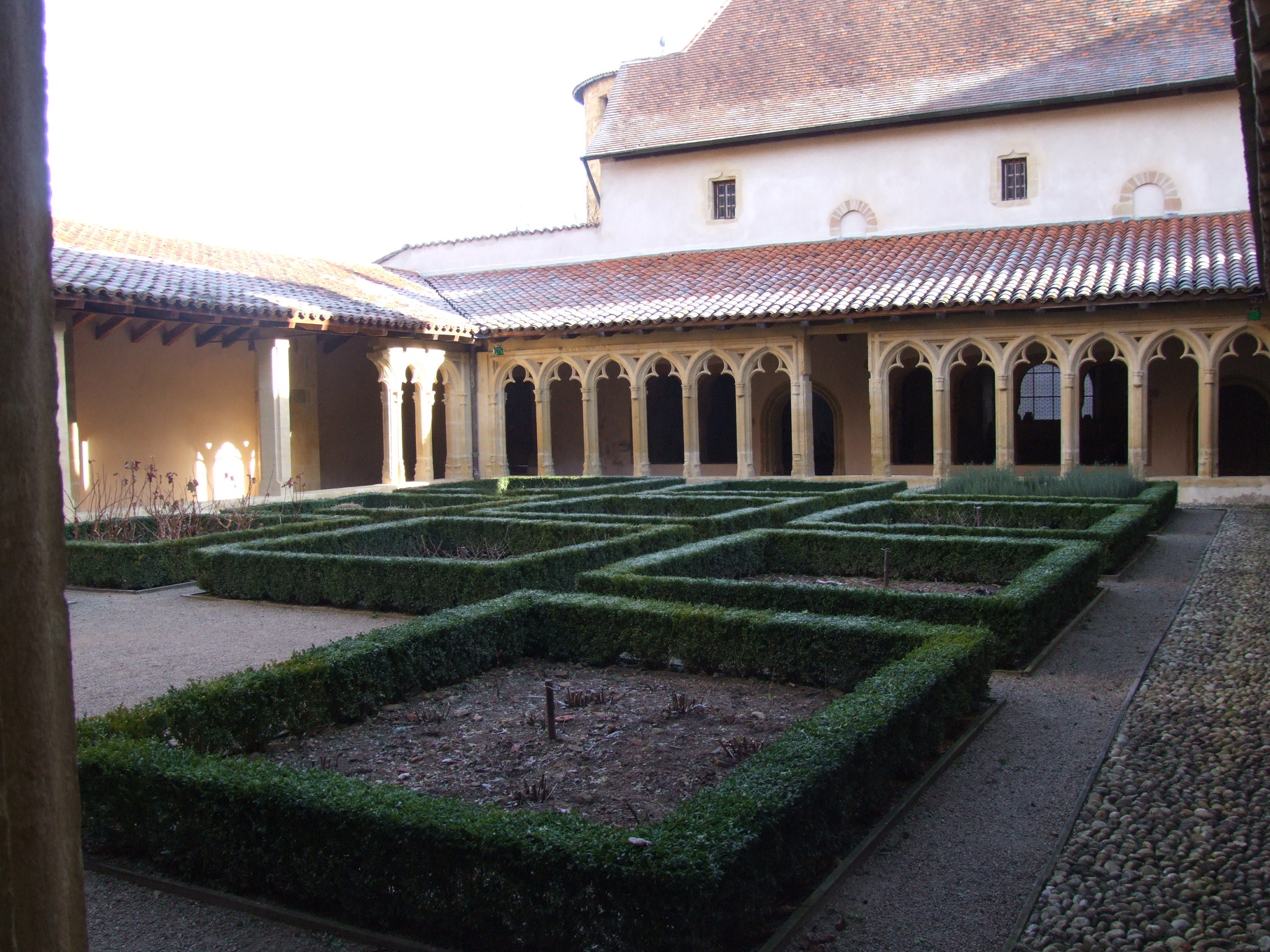
The Gothic cloister at Charlieu
