= Felix, Fortunatus, and Achilleus =

Three 3rd-century Christian saints and martyrs

Saints Felix, Fortunatus, and Achilleus
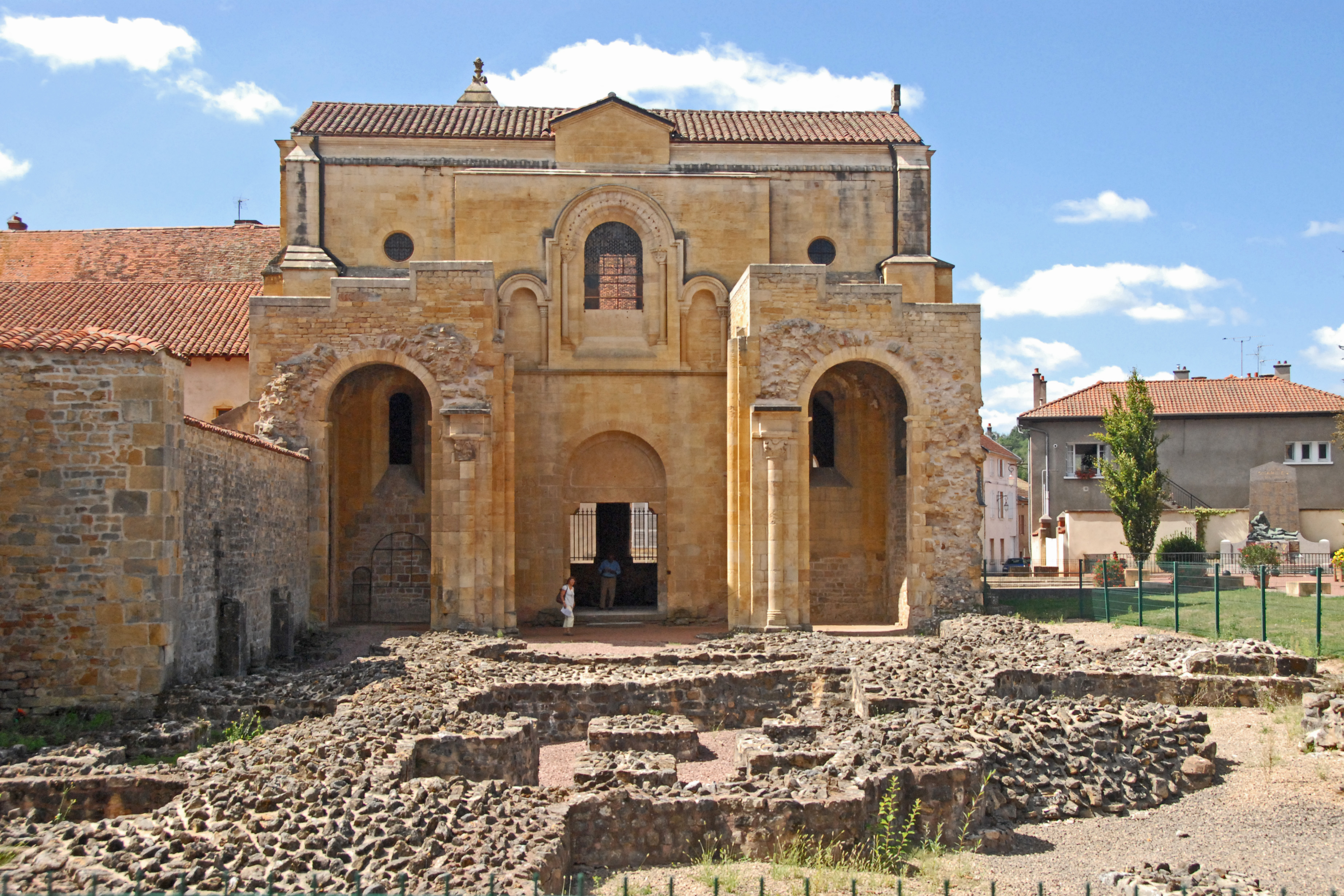
- Ruins of the abbey church of Charlieu, which is dedicated to the three co-martyrs.

Martyrs
- Died: 212 AD; Valence, Gaul
- Cause of death: Beheading
- Venerated in: Roman Catholic Church, Eastern Orthodox Church
- Canonized: Pre-congregation
- Feast: 23 April
- Patronage: Valence, Drôme, France

Felix, Fortunatus, and Achilleus were 3rd-century Christian saints who suffered martyrdom during the reign of Caracalla. Felix, a priest, Fortunatus and Achilleus, both deacons, were sent by Irenaeus, to Valence, to convert the locals. It is said that they died c. 212.

== Legends ==
Felix, Fortunatus and Achilleus were sent to Valence, by Saint Irenaeus of Lyon. From a humble lodging wherein they lived a life of much penance they evangelised the town.

They also performed many miracles in the area of Valence, and through their preaching many people were converted. This led to their arrest. They were freed from prison, by angels, who told them to destroy all the idols of the temples in Valence. So Felix, Fortunatus, and Achilleus, destroyed images of Mercury, Saturn, and a particularly valuable amber statue of Jupiter. For their actions the three were captured again, had their legs broken, followed by torture on wheels. Having survived all of these torments they were beheaded.

Although the individuals themselves may not be entirely legendary, no historical incidents of their lives have been preserved.

== Veneration ==
Relics believed to be those of Felix, Fortunatus, and Achilleus, are venerated in Valencia, Spain. There are also supposedly relics of Fortunatus in Sant'Andrea della Valle in Rome.

== See also ==
- Other saints Felix
- Other saints Fortunatus
