= Emerich Szerencsés =

Deputy treasurer of the Kingdom of Hungary

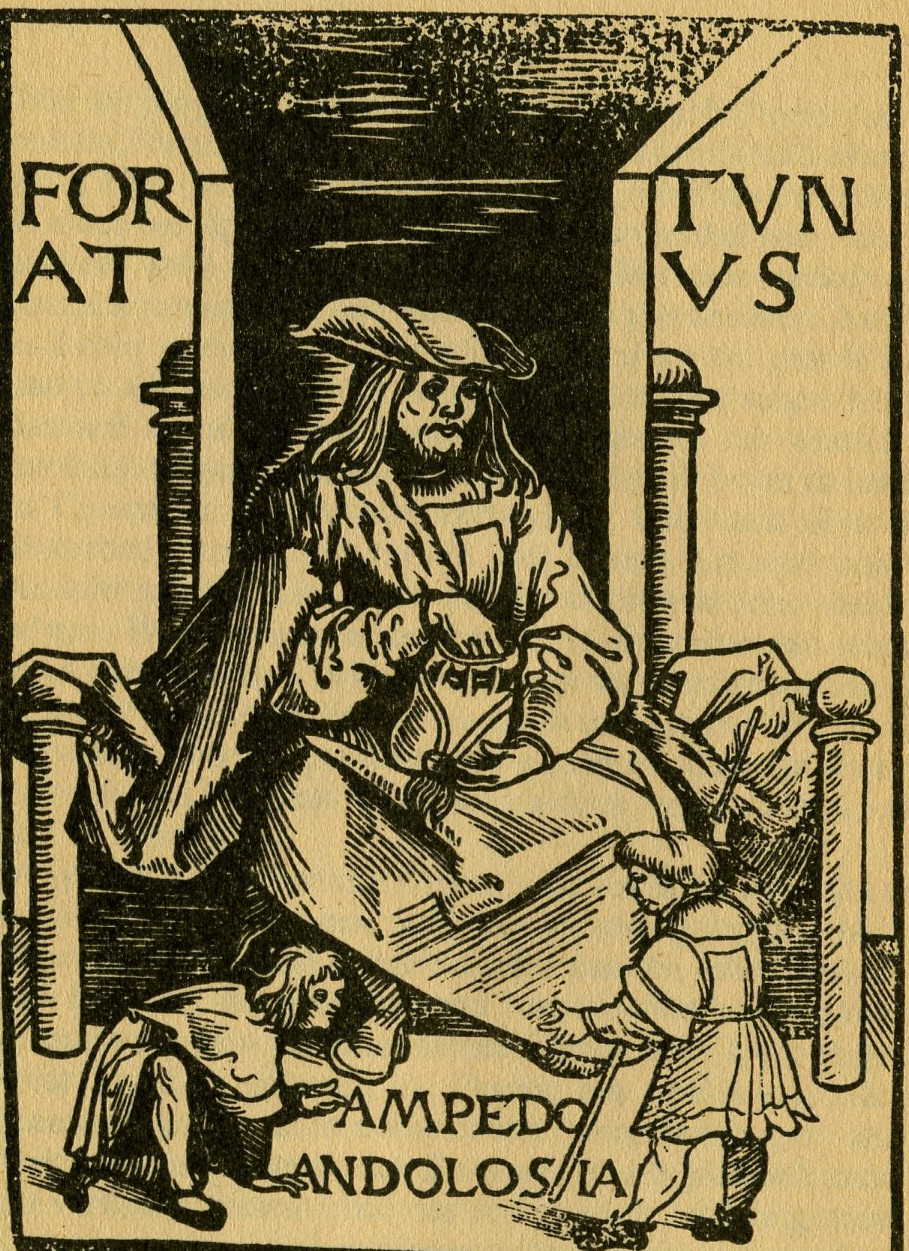
Fortunatus cover image of the 1509 edition (Augsburg).jpg

Emerich Szerencsés (also known as Fortunatus; died August 1526) was deputy treasurer of the Kingdom of Hungary and a Jewish convert to Christianity.

== Life ==
He was born Jewish but had to convert when it became known that he had sex with a Christian woman. He was baptised by Ladislaus Szalkai, Archbishop of Grau, and took the baptismal name Emerich after his sponsor Emerich Perényi, Palatine of Hungary. His wife and his sons, Abraham and Ephraim, remained practising Jews. After his conversion, he was appointed deputy treasurer, using his position to send coded letters warning Hungarian Jews of imminent persecution, to secure the revocation of the expulsion of the Jews from Prague and to save a Jewish man and woman who had been condemned to death by fire. He also became a favourite of Louis II of Hungary.

When the Jewish community of Ofen was accused of ritual murder he convinced Louis to hand the accuser over to him. He gave a Jewish education to the children of another baptised Jew and gave to Jewish charities every Friday until his death. As a reward, the rabbis of Ofen, Padua and Constantinople ordered that Szerencsés' sons Abraham and Ephraim should be called up to the Law by their father's name - usually the sons of baptised Jews had to be called up by their grandfather's names. This also recognised their view that, at heart, Szerencsés was still a Jew.

Stephan Verböczi and other Hungarian nobles accused him of causing the country's financial problems, and some members of the 1525 Diet moved for him to be burned at the stake. The accusations of gross negligence proved justified, since he had used state funds for private ends, as did many respected noblemen at the time. Louis II briefly imprisoned him, and his home was attacked and looted by a mob led by the nobles' servants, though Szerencsés himself managed to escape. Another mob simultaneously stormed and looted the city's ghetto. With the invasion threat from the Ottoman Empire looming large, Szerencsés was restored to favour at the 1526 Diet but died later that year, with many Jews at his deathbed.

== Sources ==
- http://www.jewishencyclopedia.com/articles/14177-szerencses-fortunatus-emerich
- http://www.geschichteinchronologie.com/eu/ungarn/EncJud_juden-in-Ungarn01-roemer-bis-1919-ENGL.html
