= Christ within =

Christ within (or Christ Within) is a theological term having various meanings that are emphasized in a number of Christian-oriented religious traditions.

The first use may be "[to be] closely united with Christ within you" in Imitation of Christ, generally attributed to Thomas à Kempis (died 1471).

It is especially associated with the Religious Society of Friends (largely in English-speaking countries, arising about 1650), where it is often equated with the Inner Light.

The American denomination Church of the Truth, emphasizing "empower[ing] all people to awaken the Christ within", was founded in 1913.

Alfred H. Ackley composed the hymn "He Lives" in 1933, including the lyric "He [Jesus Christ] lives within my heart".

Paramahansa Yogananda created his Self-Realization Fellowship in 1920, and died in 1952; "... The Resurrection of the Christ Within You ..." appears in the title of a work attributed to him and first published, posthumously, in 2004.
