= Markus Mühling =

Markus Mühling (born 27 December 1969, Frankfurt am Main) is a Protestant systematic theologian and philosopher of religion whose work focuses largely on the doctrine of God, eschatology, the atonement and the dialogue between the natural sciences and theology.

== Career ==
Mühling graduated from Christian-Albrechts University, Kiel with a Dr. theol. in systematic theology, and received his venia legendi in systematic theology from Ruprecht-Karls University, Heidelberg, and has since been visiting professor at King's College, Aberdeen and member of the Center of Theological Inquiry, Princeton. From 2011 to 2018 he has been professor for systematic theology and international-interdisciplinary dialogue at the Leuphana University of Lüneburg, Germany. In 2014, Leuphana University awarded him the research prize for the best monograph. He is currently professor for systematic theology at the Theological University of Wuppertal/Bethel.

== Work ==
One of Mühling's major impacts on the field of the doctrine of God has been his work on love as a model for the trinitarian understanding of God and its soteriological impacts. He has worked extensively on non-empirical presuppositions in the work of physicist Albert Einstein as well as on theological discussions of the neurosciences and new trends in evolutionary theory. He has also written textbooks in the areas of eschatology and ethics.

Mühling's approach can be characterized as work towards establishing and widening an ontology of narrative relationality that focuses on constitutive processual relations. He believes that increased inter- and transdisciplinary engagement is necessary for our understanding of the great questions as well as for the well-being of society. God can be understood as a trinitarian related, dramatic and open event in God's own eternity, which creates, sustains, atones and perfects creation in resonance with God's own relational being as becoming. In faith, God's presence can be perceived in accordance with phenomenological approaches to the neurosciences. Prof. Mühling regards recent developments in evolutionary theory (e.g. niche construction), as fruitful resources for modelling theological anthropology.

== Selected publications (books) ==
- M. Mühling. 2014. "Resonances: Neuroscience, Evolution and Theology. Evolutionary Niche Construction, the Ecological Brain and Narrative-Relational Theology". Göttingen/Bristol (CT): Vandenhoek & Ruprecht. ISBN 978-3-525-57036-4
- M. Mühling. 2015. "T&T Clark Handbook of Christian Eschatology". New York/London/Sydney/New Delhi: Bloomsbury. ISBN 978-0567023438 (forthcoming)
- M. Mühling. 2013. "Liebesgeschichte Gott. Systematische Theologie im Konzept". Göttingen/Bristol (CT): Vandenhoeck & Ruprecht. ISBN 978-3-525-56406-6
- M. Mühling. 2012. "Systematische Theologie: Ethik. Eine christliche Theorie vorzuziehenden Handelns." Göttingen/Bristol (CT): Vandenhoeck & Ruprecht/UTB. ISBN 978-3-8252-3748-6
- M. Mühling. 2011. "Einstein und die Religion. Das Wechselverhältnis zwischen religiös-weltanschaulichen Gehalten und naturwissenschaftlicher Theoriebildung Albert Einsteins in seiner Entwicklung." Göttingen/Bristol (CT): Vandenhoeck & Ruprecht. ISBN 978-3-525-56989-4
- M. Mühling. 2007. "Grundinformation Eschatologie. Systematische Theologie in der Perspektive der Hoffnung." Göttingen/Bristol (CT): Vandenhoeck & Ruprecht/UTB. ISBN 978-3-8252-2918-4
- M. Mühling. 2005a. "Versöhnendes Handeln – Handeln in Versöhnung. Gottes Opfer an die Menschen." Göttingen/Bristol (CT): Vandenhoeck & Ruprecht. ISBN 978-3-525-56335-9
- M. Mühling. 2005b. "A Theological Journey into Narnia. An analysis of the message beneath the text of »The Lion, the Witch and the Wardrobe« by C.S. Lewis". Göttingen/Bristol (CT): Vandenhoeck & Ruprecht. ISBN 978-3-525-60423-6
- M. Mühling. 2005c. "Gott ist Liebe. Studien zum Verständnis der Liebe als Modell des trinitarischen Redens von Gott". 2nd ed. Marburg: Elwert. ISBN 3-7708-1272-7
