= Kephale (New Testament) =

Greek word in the Bible

The word kephalē (Ancient Greek: κεφαλή) appears some 75 times in the Greek New Testament. It is of considerable interest today because of differences of biblical interpretation between Christian egalitarians and complementarians as to the intent of the New Testament concerning roles of authority assigned biblically to husbands and wives. A prime example appears in Ephesians 5:21–24 where all Christians are told:

^{21}Submit to one another out of reverence for Christ.

and the following three verses say:

^{22}Wives, submit yourselves to your own husbands as you do to the Lord. ^{23}For the husband is the head (kephalē) of the wife as Christ is the head (kephalē) of the church, his body, of which he is the Savior. ^{24}Now as the church submits to Christ, so also wives should submit to their husbands in everything."^{NIV}

== Complementarians ==
Complementarians translate 'head' (kephalē) in the above verses (and in similar passages in other Pauline epistles) as meaning 'presupposed authority', 'superior rank', 'leader', signifying the servant leadership role a husband has with his wife.

Their argument for this translation is founded in evidence in wider Greek literature. Wayne Grudem, Council on Biblical Manhood and Womanhood, reports that in his research of 2336 ancient Greek artifacts, over 50 instances kephalē are translated to mean having presupposed authority. He writes that none of those instances are translated to 'source', thus refuting the egalitarians' claim. Grudem also notes a personal letter in 1997 from P. G. W. Glare, then the editor of the Liddell, Scott, Jones and McKenzie Greek-English lexicon (LSJ), stating that the entry for kephalē is unsatisfactory and that the translation of 'source' does not exist.

== Christian egalitarians ==
Christian egalitarians propose two possible treatments of the Apostle Paul's use of kephalē:

(1) Christian egalitarians believe kephalē in the Apostle Paul's Epistles more likely means 'source' or 'origin' since the Genesis 2:24 account of Creation indicates that the man was the "source" of the woman since she was described in Genesis 2:21–22 as having been created from Adam's "side", the Hebrew word tsela (צְלָעֹת). Old Testament laws of primogeniture gave superior rights to the first-born male (Adam). Since Old Testament teachings historically had given the husband, being male, a superior position in the marriage, kephalē was being used in the sense of 'source' or 'origin'. They also reference the meaning given in the LSJ for source/origin.

(2) Since first-century Christians were legally held to the Greco-Roman law of patria potestas—"the Rule of the Fathers" which gave a father almost unlimited power over his household of wife, children, and slaves, Paul was doing his best to "Christianize" the harsh law to make it more tolerable, at least conceptually, for wives who had no choice but to do their best to cope with the law that put them at distinct disadvantages. Typically this argument is connected to a rejection of biblical inerrancy and adoption of a trajectory hermeneutic where modern day Christians, with careful consideration, can move beyond the ethical standard laid out in some scriptures in the New Testament. Slaves, Women & Homosexuals by William J. Webb provides an argument for this understanding.

Paul's counsel to the husbands in New Testament passages that describe husbands as being kephalē made potentially greater demands on the husbands. Paul told them to "love your wives, just as Christ loved the church and gave himself up for her. ... Husbands ought to love their wives as their own bodies. He who loves his wife loves himself".
