= Stephanas =

Member of the church at Corinth baptized by Paul the Apostle

Saint Stephanas
- Born: unknown
- Died: c. 1st century
- Venerated in: Eastern Orthodox Church
- Canonized: Pre-Congregation
- Feast: January 4

Stephanas (Greek: Στεφανᾶς, Stephanas, meaning "crowned", from Greek: στεφανόω, stephanoó, "to crown") was a member of the church at Corinth, whose family were among the limited number of believers whom Paul the Apostle had baptized there and whom Paul refers to as the “first-fruits of Achaia”.

He is mentioned by Paul in 1 Corinthians 16:17:

I was glad when Stephanas, Fortunatus and Achaicus arrived, because they have supplied what was lacking from you

Teignmouth Shore, writing in Ellicott's Commentary for Modern Readers, suggests that Stephanas, Fortunatus and Achaicus had come from Corinth to Ephesus, probably with the letter from the Corinthians (1 Corinthians 7:1) to which Paul was sending a response. Paul urged the church in Corinth to "be in subjection to such men and to everyone who helps in the work and labours" and to "acknowledge such men".
