= Fortunatus (New Testament person) =

Person mentioned in Corinthians 16:17

Saint Fortunatus of the Seventy
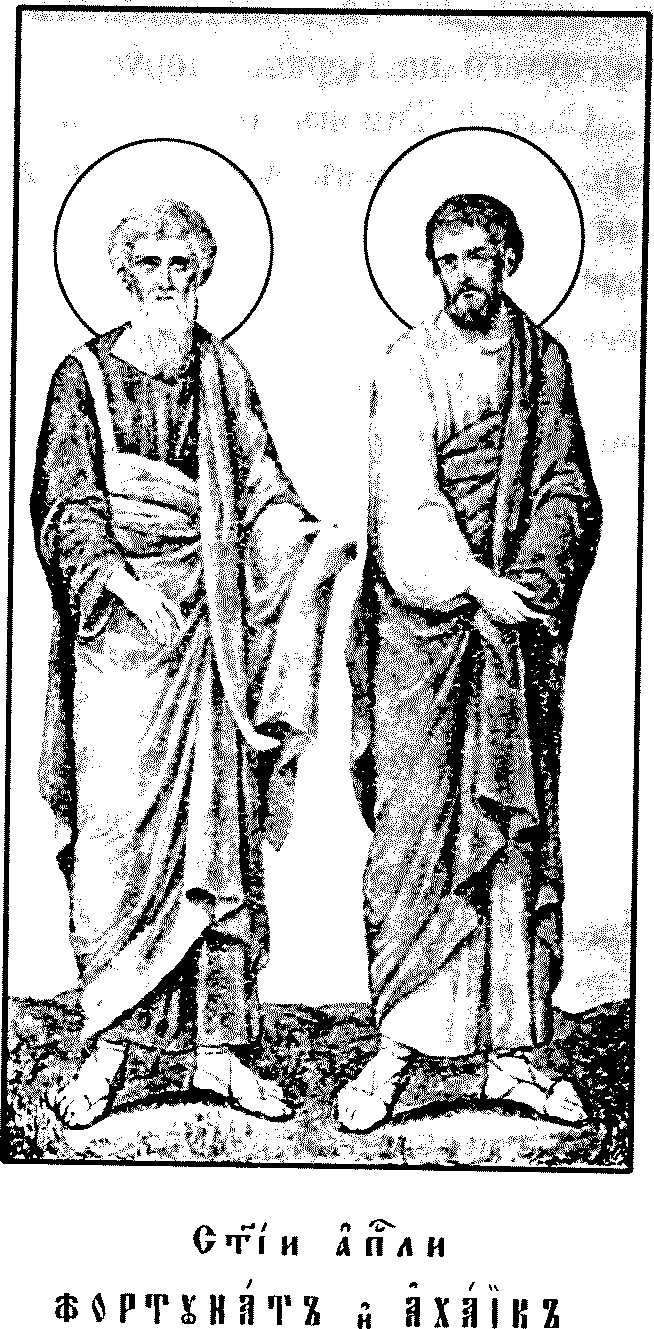

Apostle of the Seventy
- Born: 1st century AD
- Died: 1st century AD
- Honored in: Eastern Orthodox Church
- Feast: 15 June

Fortunatus was an early Christian mentioned by St Paul in I Corinthians 16:17: I was glad when Stephanas, Fortunatus, and Achaicus arrived, because they have supplied what was lacking from you.

== Church traditions ==
Fortunatus was a disciple from Corinth, of Roman birth or origin, as his name indicates, who visited Paul at Ephesus, most probably bringing contributions. He travelled back, along with Stephanus and Achaicus, bearing Paul's first Epistle to the Corinthians.

=== Hymns ===
Troparion (Tone 3)

Holy apostle Fortunatus of the Seventy;
Entreat the merciful;
To grant our souls forgiveness of transgressions.

Kontakion (Tone 4 )

The Church ever sees you as a shining star, O apostle Fortunatus,
Your miracles have manifested great enlightenment.
Therefore we cry out to Christ:
"Save those who with faith honour Your apostle, O Most Merciful One."

== See also ==
- St Fortunatus (disambiguation)
