= Achaicus of Corinth =

Biblical figure in Christianity

Saint Achaicus of Corinth
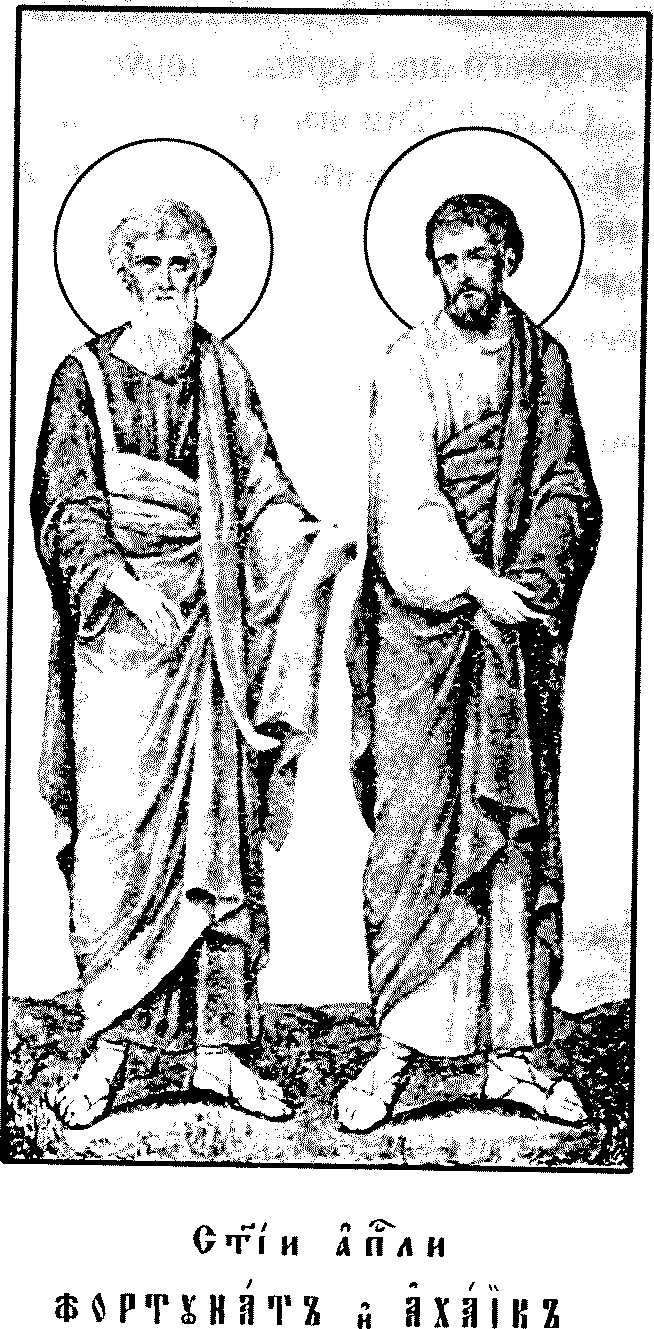

Apostle of the Seventy
- Born: Ἀχαϊκός Achaikos
- Hometown: Corinth, Peloponnese, Greece
- Died: AD 1st century
- Venerated in: Eastern Orthodox Church; Roman Catholic Church
- Feast: 15 June

Saint Achaicus of Corinth (Ancient Greek: Ἀχαϊκός Achaikos, "belonging to Achaia") was a Corinthian Christian saint who according to the Bible, together with Saints Fortunatus and Stephanas, carried a letter from the Corinthians to Saint Paul, and from Saint Paul to the Corinthians (1 Corinthians 16:17; cf. also 16:15).

== Life ==
According to the holy tradition of the Eastern Orthodox Church, Achaicus is also often numbered as one of the Seventy Disciples, a group of early followers sent out by Jesus in Luke 10:17–20. The biblical account does not mention the names of the seventy disciples, but various lists including Achaicus have been compiled since the 7th century, such as in the Orthodox Study Bible. It is not known whether the three Corinthians walked to Ephesus, a distance of about 1448 kilometres or 900 miles, or crossed the Aegean Sea by boat.

== Veneration ==
Achaicus is venerated as saint by Eastern Orthodox Church, Roman Catholic Church and other Christian churches. In the Orthodox Church, he is commemorated with a feast day on 15 June, with his companion Fortunatas. He is also remembered on the Synaxis of the Seventy Apostles on 4 January.
