= Flag of Flemish Brabant =

Flag of Flemish-Brabant

"Sable a lion or armed and langued gules an escutcheon gules a fess argent"

The flag of Flemish Brabant was adopted on January 17, 1995, and was approved on April 16, 1996. It consists of a yellow lion with a red tongue and claws (Leo Belgicus) on a black field. The flag is displayed on all official buildings of the province. The lion is based on the Brabantian lion of the Duchy of Brabant, as well as the colors of the Belgian flag.

In the center of the lion, a heart shield is depicted in the color combination red-white-red. These are the official colors of Leuven, the capital of the province, and appear in this color order in both the flag and the coat of arms of Leuven.

Coat of arms of leuven

According to legend, this color combination (red-white-red) refers to the battle against the Vikings in 891. Arnulf of Carinthia inflicted a crushing defeat on the Vikings at that time. During the battle, so much blood was shed that the two banks of the Dyle turned red (the two red bands), with the Dyle flowing between them (the white band). In reality, the flag of Leuven carries the colors of Lower Lotharingia and is likely not older than the 13th century

The official description of the flag is:

Sable a lion or armed and langued gules an escutcheon gules a fess argent

a sable gold lion armed and langued red and an escutcheon red a fess white

== Flags of Flemish Brabant ==
=== Historical flags of Flemish Brabant ===
Flag	Date	Country	Use
	1995–Now	Flemish Brabant	Flag of Flemish Brabant
	1815–1995	Brabant (province)	Flag of the former Belgian province Brabant (before split in 1995)
	1183–1795	Duchy of Brabant	Flag of the Duchy of Brabant

=== Elements of the flag of Flemish Brabant ===
Flag	Date	Country	Use
	1995–Now	Flemish Brabant	Variant flag of Brabant seen on the flag of Flemish Brabant
	1997–Now	Leuven	Shield of Leuven on the lion of Flemish Brabant

=== Similar flags to the flag of Flemish Brabant ===
Flag	Date	Province/city	Use
	1995–Now	Walloon-Brabant	Flag of Walloon-Brabant (Belgian province)
	1997–Now	Leuven	Flag of Leuven (Belgian municipality)

== See also ==
- Flemish Brabant
- Leuven
- Flag of Walloon-Brabant
- Coat of arms of Walloon-Brabant
