= Coat of arms of West Flanders =

Heraldic symbol used by the Belgian province West-Flanders

Coat of arms of West-Flanders
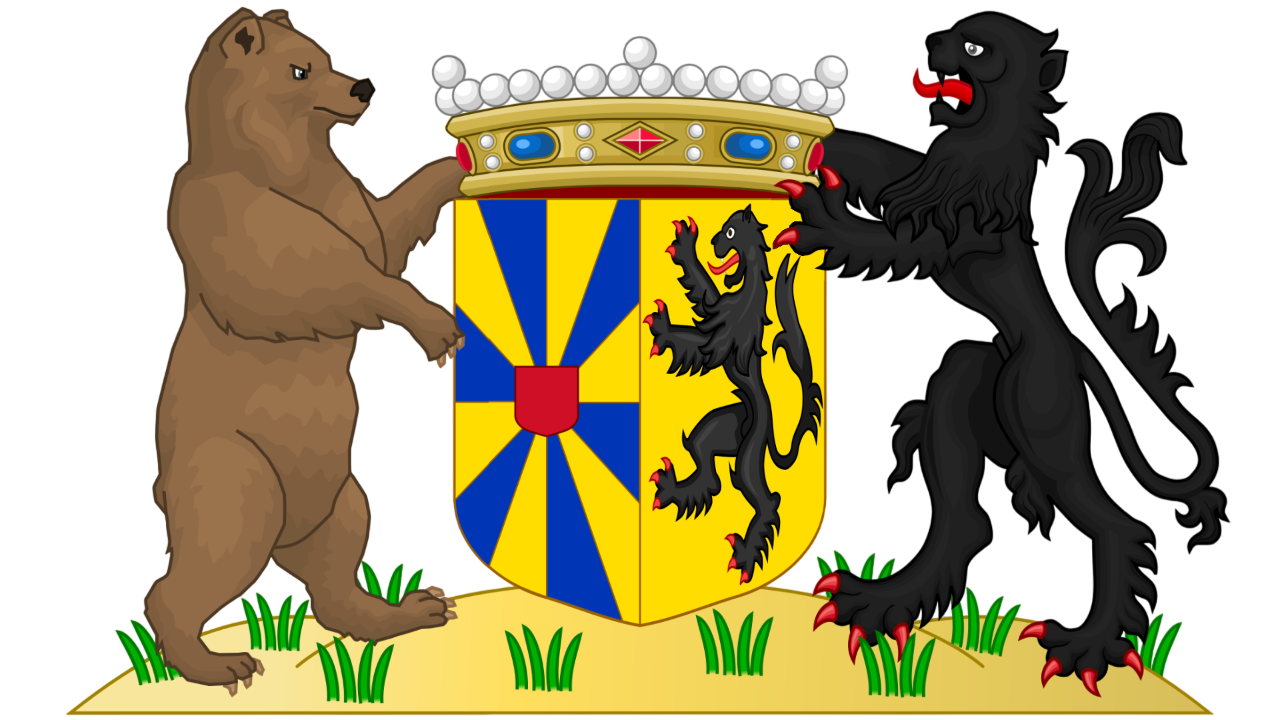
- Coat of arms of West-Flanders

Versions
- Lesser arms of West-Flanders
- Earliest mention: 1831 (Left side: 1102 right side: 1162)
- Adopted: 17 May 1837

The coat of arms of West-Flanders is a heraldic symbol used by the Belgian province West-Flanders. Although the arms was already in use by the province in 1815 (under the United Kingdom of the Netherlands), the weapon was then topped with the arms of the Netherlands. After the Belgian revolution, the arms of the Netherlands was removed and it became the official symbol of the province in 1837.

== Design ==
The arms is described as: "Divided

1. Desired of twelve pieces of gold and azure, with a heart shield gules

2. In gold a lion sable, clawed and tongued gules.

3.The shield topped with a count's coronet with thirteen pearls, three of which are elevated

4. The shield, held on the right by a bear of natural color and on the left by a lion sable, clawed and tongued gules. The whole placed on a dune ground of natural color covered with beachgrass."

The coat of arms of the province of West Flanders is the coat of arms of Flanders crossed with the old coat of arms of Flanders as recorded in the Gelre coat of arms, surrounded by external ornaments. The coat of arms is topped with a count's crown and has a bear and a lion as shield holders. It is depicted on dune ground.

== History ==
=== County of Flanders ===
From the 14th century onwards, various armorials claim that the House of Flanders bore a coveted shield of twelve pieces of azure and gold, with a gules heart shield, before the (Flemish) Lion (like the modern West Flemish provincial flag).

The coat of arms is likely derived from a misinterpreted decorative mount on the shield of the Flemish Count Willem Clito (1102-1128), as depicted on his tomb in the Abbey of Saint-Bertinus in Saint-Omer. That shield features a central umbo (ornamental knob) from which several rays radiate towards the edges of the shield. In his search for the old coat of arms of Flanders, the 14th-century Abbot Iperius, biographer of the Flemish House of Counts, interpreted this as a coveted shield with a gules heart shield; the colours - which he must have added himself - are probably those of the French royal family. So powerful was his vision that this coat of arms became completely established in just 30 years.

The Flemish lion derives from the arms of the Counts of Flanders. Their first appearance is on a seal of Count Philip of Alsace, dating from 1163. As such they constitute the oldest of the many territorial arms bearing a lion in the Low Countries. Still, Count Philip was not the first of his line to bear a lion, for his cousin, William of Ypres, already used a seal with a lion passant in 1158; and the shield on the enamel effigy of about 1155 from the tomb of his maternal uncle, Geoffrey Plantagenet, Count of Anjou, bears numerous lions rampant.

=== West-Flanders ===
The design of the coat of arms of West Flanders was first seen when the province was still part of the United Kingdom of the Netherlands, in 1815. It consisted of its own coat of arms, topped by the coat of arms of the Netherlands with a count's crown above.

This design remained after the Belgian Revolution in 1830, when West Flanders became a Belgian province. The coat of arms remained the same: on the left, twelve gold and blue pieces with a red heart shield, and on the right, the Flemish lion. However, within the Kingdom of Belgium, the Dutch coat of arms and the Dutch count's crown disappeared and were replaced by a Belgian count's crown.

The coat of arms was officially put into use on May 17, 1837, and would later serve as inspiration for the provincial flag.

== Historic arms ==
=== County of Flanders ===

The coat of arms of the County of Flanders was the first coat of arms of Flanders. The lion was first used by Philip of Alsace in the 12th century as his personal coat of arms as Count of Flanders and was later also used by the County of Flanders itself, both as a coat of arms and as a flag/armorial banner.

The arms is described as: "Or, a lion rampant armed and langued Gules".

In the early years of the county, the lion was sometimes depicted as a completely black lion, without red accents, which is what the Flemish battle flag is derived from, but in later and more detailed versions, the Flemish lion was (almost) always depicted with red claws and tongue.

=== County of Flanders (old version) ===

The first coat of arms of the County of Flanders wasn't a lion, but a popular background, featuring the colors blue and yellow with a red shield in the center. It was attributed to the legendary Liederik van Buc. It may have been derived from a misinterpreted decorative mount on the shield of the Flemish Count Willem Clito. This symbol was used until the 12th century, from which time onward, the Flemish lion increasingly became the symbol of the county.

The arms is described as: "Desired of twelve pieces of gold and azure, with a heart shield of gules"

Today, this coat of arms is the symbol of the Belgian province of West Flanders. It is identical to the province's flag, to demonstrate its historical ties with the County of Flanders, was introduced on May 27, 1997, and approved by the Flemish Minister of Culture.

=== Old provincial arms ===

The first coat of arms of the province of West-Flanders was nearly the same as the current. This was used from 1815 until the Belgian revolution in 1830.

The arms is described as: "Divided

1. Desired of twelve pieces of gold and azure, with a heart shield gules

2. In gold a lion sable, clawed and tongued gules.

3. The shield topped azure, studded with blocks of gold, a lion of gold, crowned with a crown, tongued and nailed gules, holding in the right fore-claw in an oblique left position a sword of silver with a hilt of gold and in the left fore-claw a bundle of seven arrows of silver with points of gold, the arrows being tied together with a ribbon also of gold and the shield crowned by a count's crown"

The design of the coat of arms of West Flanders first appeared when the province was still part of the United Kingdom of the Netherlands, in 1815. It consisted of its own coat of arms, topped by the coat of arms of the Netherlands with a count's crown above.

== Old banner ==
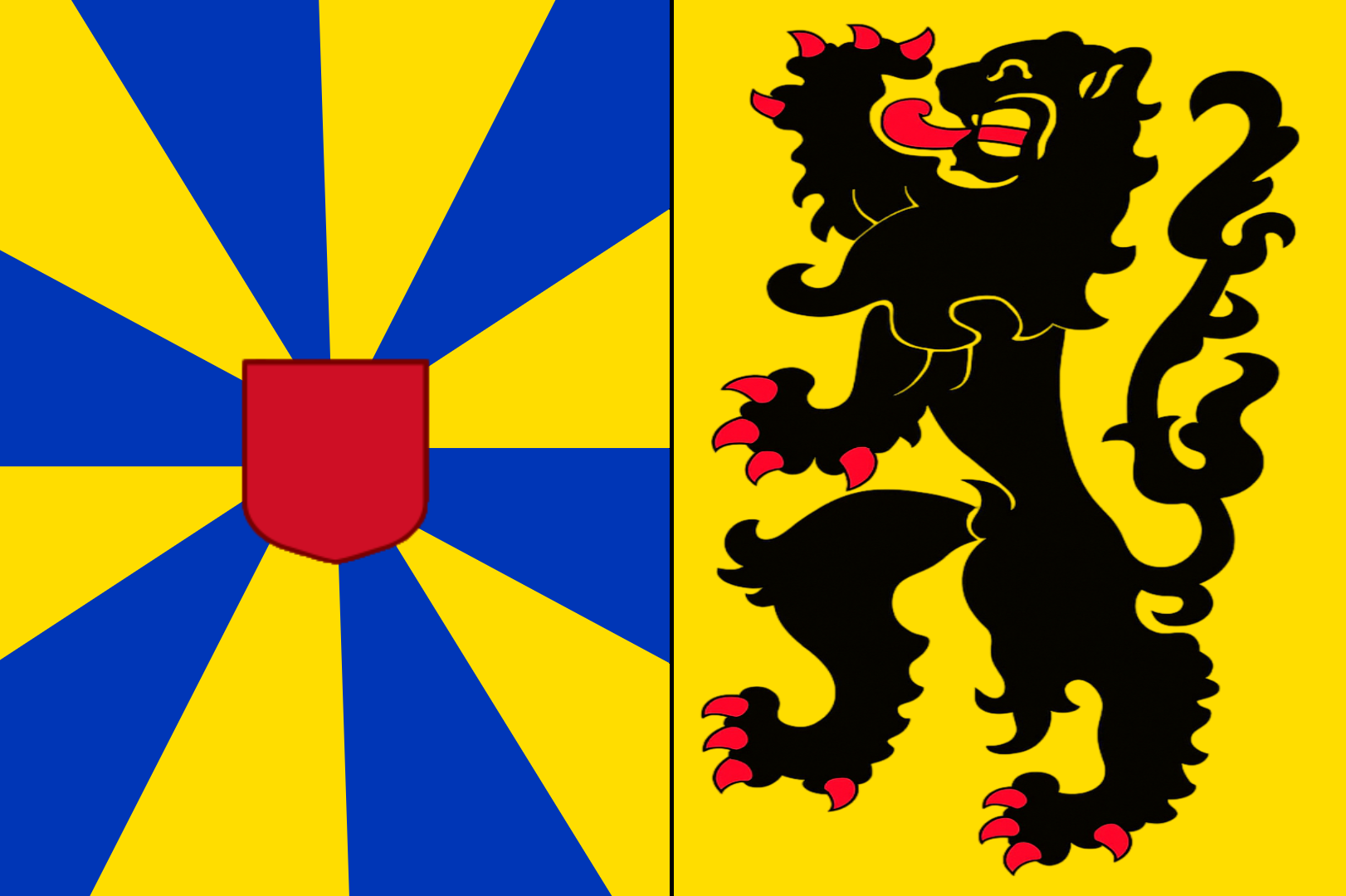
Old banner of West-Flanders

The old (unofficial) banner of West-Flanders was the (old) coat of arms of West-Flanders in flag form (or banner form).

The description of the flag is as follows: "Divided

1. Desired of twelve pieces of gold and azure, with a heart shield gules

2. In gold a lion sable, clawed and tongued gules.

The old (unofficial) banner of West Flanders, its design refers to the historical coat of arms of the County of Flanders (the old and the new), which used both the old and new arms on its banner and coat of arms. The coat of arms was previously (unofficially) used as the flag of West Flanders, but was later dropped when the official provincial flag was adopted in 1997.

== See also ==
- Flag of West-Flanders
- Coat of arms of Flanders
- Coat of arms of Brabant
- Coat of arms of Belgium
