= Flag of West Flanders =

Flag of West-Flanders

The flag of West Flanders features a coveted blue and yellow background in twelve sections, with a red heart shield in the center. The official flag, as it is now, was approved on May 27, 1997, by the Flemish Minister of Culture.

== Design ==
The flag is described as:

"Coveted of twelve pieces of gold and azure, with a heart shield gules in the centre"

The official flag of the Belgian province of West Flanders was approved on May 27, 1997 by the Flemish Minister of Culture (then Luc Martens)

== History ==
From the 14th century onwards, various armorials claim that the House of Flanders bore a coveted shield of twelve pieces of azure and gold, with a gules heart shield, before the (Flemish) Lion (like the modern West Flemish provincial flag).

The coat of arms is likely derived from a misinterpreted decorative mount on the shield of the Flemish Count Willem Clito (1102-1128), as depicted on his tomb in the Abbey of Saint-Bertinus in Saint-Omer. That shield features a central umbo (ornamental knob) from which several rays radiate towards the edges of the shield. In his search for the old coat of arms of Flanders, the 14th-century Abbot Iperius, biographer of the Flemish House of Counts, interpreted this as a coveted shield with a gules heart shield; the colours - which he must have added himself - are probably those of the French royal family. So powerful was his vision that this coat of arms became completely established in just 30 years.

== Old banner ==
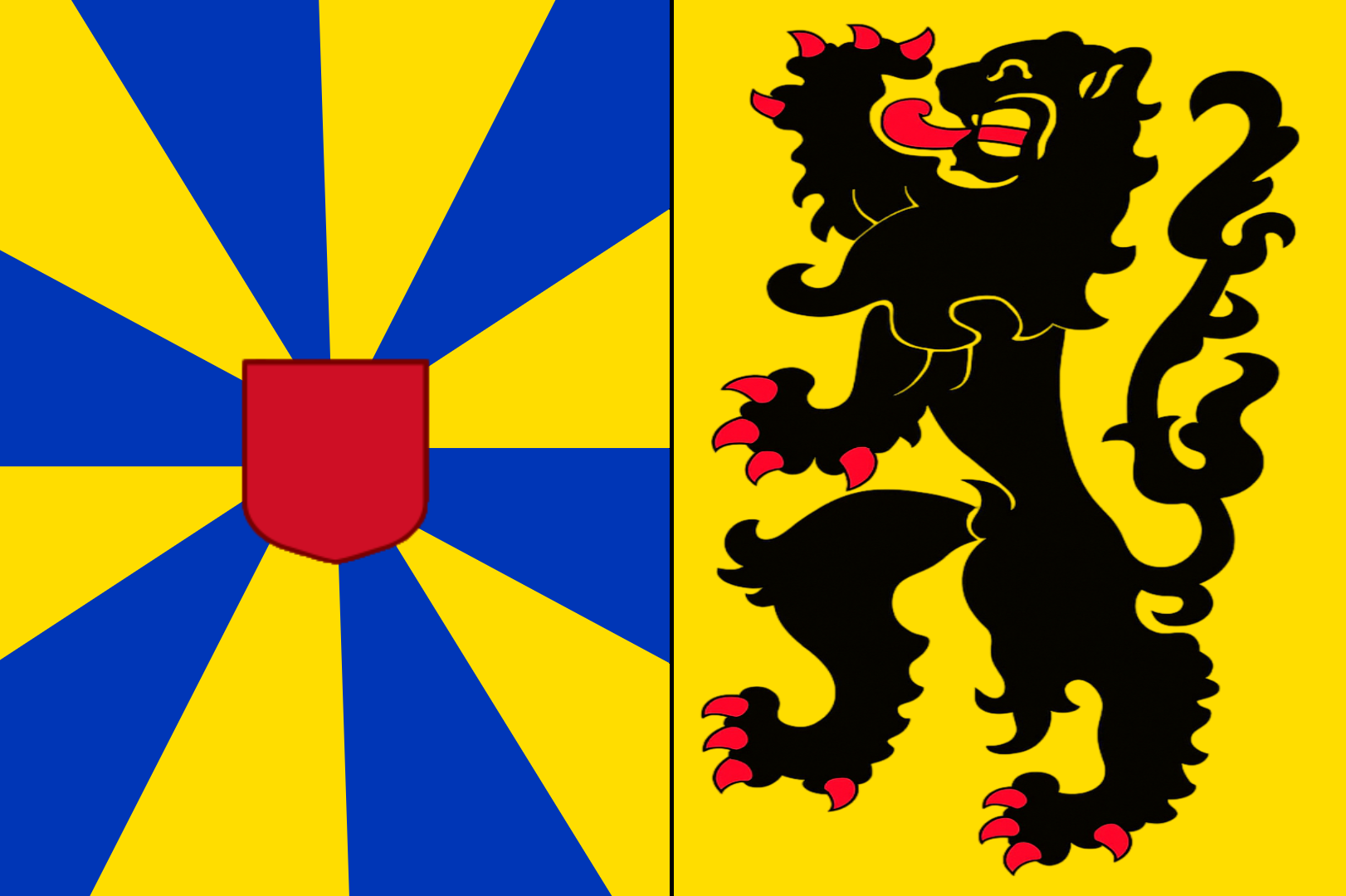
Old banner of West-Flanders

The old (unofficial) banner of West-Flanders was the (old) coat of arms of West-Flanders in flag form (or banner form).

The description of the flag is as follows: "Divided

1. Desired of twelve pieces of gold and azure, with a heart shield gules

2. In gold a lion sable, clawed and tongued gules.

The old (unofficial) banner of West Flanders, its design refers to the historical coat of arms of the County of Flanders (the old and the new), which used both the old and new arms on its banner and coat of arms. The coat of arms was previously (unofficially) used as the flag of West Flanders, but was later dropped when the official provincial flag was adopted in 1997.

== See also ==
- Coat of arms of West Flanders
- Flag of Flanders
- Flag of Brabant
- Flag of Belgium
