= Flag of Brabant (Belgium) =

In black a lion of gold, nailed and tongued gules

The flag of Brabant or the Brabantian lion is a heraldic symbol that has been associated with the region Brabant since the 12th century, mainly the Duchy of Brabant (1183–1795). The golden lion with red tongue and claws (Leo Belgicus) on a black shield represents strength, courage and dominion. This coat of arms was used by the Dukes of Brabant and was also the flag of the province of Brabant in Belgium (which is now split into Flemish- and Walloon- Brabant)

== Design ==
The description of the flag is as follows:

"In black a lion of gold, nailed and tongued gules"

The lion is depicted standing on its hind legs and clawing, facing the flagpole on the flag. The flag's height-to-width ratio is 2:3, which differs from the Belgian flag, but is the standard format worldwide (in practice, the Belgian flag is usually displayed in the same format).

The flag is based entirely on the coat of arms of Brabant and therefore looks exactly the same.

== Origin of the flag ==
The choice of the lion as a heraldic symbol for Brabant (and the Low Countries) has deep historical and symbolic roots. The lion became one of the most popular heraldic animals in heraldry in the Middle Ages, mainly because it stood for strength, courage and royal dignity. As ‘king of the animals’, the lion was the ideal symbol for princes and knights who wanted to show their power and bravery.

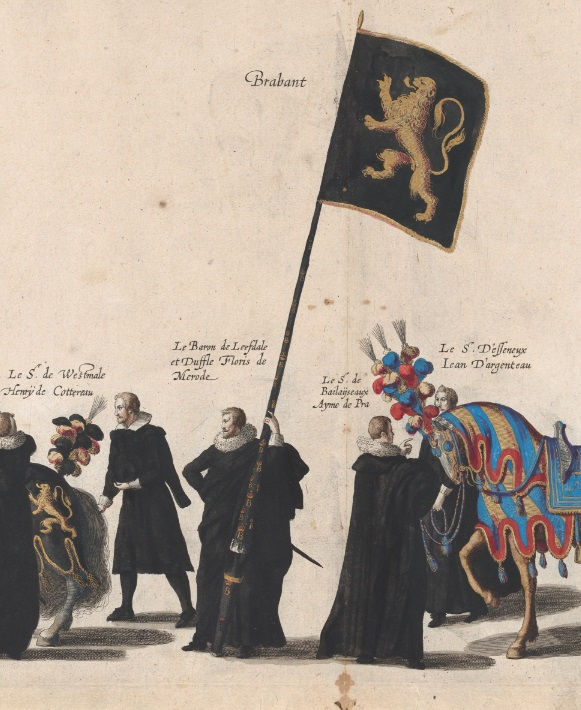
Brabantian Lion carried by Floris de Merode, Baron of Leefdael during the Funeral of Albert VII. This emblem of the dukes of Brabant is now the coat of arms of Belgium.

In the Low Countries, the lion became an important heraldic emblem for several principalities. In the County of Flanders (862–1795), a black lion on a yellow shield was introduced by Philip I of Alsace (1168 - 1191), Count of Flanders. Other principalities, such as Hainaut, Namur, Limburg and Luxembourg, also included a lion in their coats of arms.

The first Duke of Brabant who seems to have used a lion as a heraldic symbol was Godfrey the Bearded. Godfrey, then already Count of Leuven, was given the area as a fief in 1106 and used the lion in his banner. Henry I later used this lion in his coat of arms in the twelfth century. It is not known whether the lion and the shield already had the same colours at that time. The first two sources that mention this at about the same time date from the middle of the 13th century and both show a gold lion on a sable field. The coat of arms has not changed since then.

In 1581, the States of Brabant abdicated the Spanish King Philip II. This prompted them to reinstate the ducal crown. The coat of arms with the crown also came into use for State Brabant from 1648 onwards. The department of Batavian Brabant of the Batavian Republic initially replaced the crown with a laurel wreath. Upon its renaming in 1798 to the Department of the Dommel, the ducal crown was reintroduced.

In 1789, the Southern Netherlands (Belgium) revolted against Austrian rule of the region. The symbol of this revolution was the Brabantian lion, because the Duchy of Brabant was the major power and leading force behind this revolution. The region became an independent state known as the United Belgian States from 1789 until 1791. The flag of the United Belgian States resembles the flag of Belgium, it has the colors Black, yellow and red but in a different order. The flag of the United Belgians States is a horiztonal tricolor with at the top Red, in the middle black and on the bottom Yellow. The coat of arms of these States was the Brabantian lion, holding a shield and sword, on the shield it stated "LIBERTAS", which means Liberty.

In the United Kingdom of the Netherlands, founded in 1815, the old Duchy of Brabant was divided into three provinces: North Brabant, Antwerp, and South Brabant. The province of Antwerp received a new coat of arms, composed of the arms of the Margraviate of Antwerp, the Lordships of Mechelen and Turnhout, and the Kingdom. The coat of arms of Brabant was therefore not included. The coats of arms of North and South Brabant were identical and identical to the familiar coat of arms. After the secession of Belgium, the coat of arms of Brabant remained unchanged. The North Brabant lion was given two gold lions as shield-holders on July 15, 1920, it has remained unchanged since then.

South Brabant, used the Brabantian lion for its flag, and continued to use it after the Belgian revolution in 1830. After the Belgian revolution the province was renamed to just "Brabant". It was the symbol of the historic region where the province once was a port and wanted to express that it is proud of that heritage.

Because Brabant had been the most important duchy in the Southern Netherlands during the late Middle Ages, the Brabant lion was elevated to the coat of arms of Belgium. The ducal crown was naturally replaced by a royal crown. Furthermore, two lions as shield-holders and the motto "L'union Fait la Force" (Union is strength) were added. The Belgian flag is based on the Brabant coat of arms, using the colors found in the coat of arms (black, yellow and red).

On January 1, 1995, the Belgian province of Brabant was divided into Flemish, Walloon, and Brussels parts. As noted above, the coats of arms of Flemish and Walloon Brabant still strongly resemble the old coat of arms of Brabant. The Flemish coat of arms now also has shield holders and features a heart shield, intersected in three: gules, silver, and gules, in other words, the coat of arms of the Flemish Brabant capital Leuven.

== Modern day use ==
Today, the Brabant lion is rarely seen, except on the provincial flags of Flemish- and Walloon- Brabant, but otherwise, it has all but disappeared.

Every year, the Brabant lion flies above the Count's Stone in Antwerp. This was a condition stipulated by Charles V when he sold the castle to the city. The Brabant lion hung above the castle for centuries. Eight hundred years ago, Henry I of Brabant granted Antwerp city rights, and when Charles V, as the Duke of Brabant, sold the castle to the city of Antwerp in the sixteenth century, he included in the sales agreement that the flag must fly above the castle.

== Historical flags ==
Flag of the duchy of Brabant

=== Duchy of Brabant ===
The flag of the Duchy of Brabant is the first flag of the historical region of Brabant, which later served as inspiration for all derived flags of the regions.

The description of the flag is as follows: "In black a lion of gold, nailed and tongued gules"

The lion was first used in the 12th century by Godfrey the Bearded. Godfrey, already Count of Leuven, received the area as a fief in 1106 and incorporated the lion into his banner. Henry I later incorporated this lion into his coat of arms in the 12th century.

Flag of the United Belgian States

=== United Belgian States ===
The flag of the United Belgian States was based on the flag of the Duchy of Brabant, because the Brabant Revolution (1789–1790) was mainly led by the Brabant Duchy within the Austrian Netherlands. There were also variants of the flag with the Brabant lion in the center on the red-black-yellow tricolor, but the horizontal tricolor was the official flag of the United Belgian States.

The description of the flag is as follows: "Three vertical lines of red, black and gold"

The flag of the United Belgian States would later provide inspiration for the Belgian flag in 1830. In the Beginning, Belgium also used a horizontal flag, but in the order red-yellow-black. Because it looked too much like the Dutch flag, Belgium ultimately opted for the vertical tricolour.

== Old banner ==
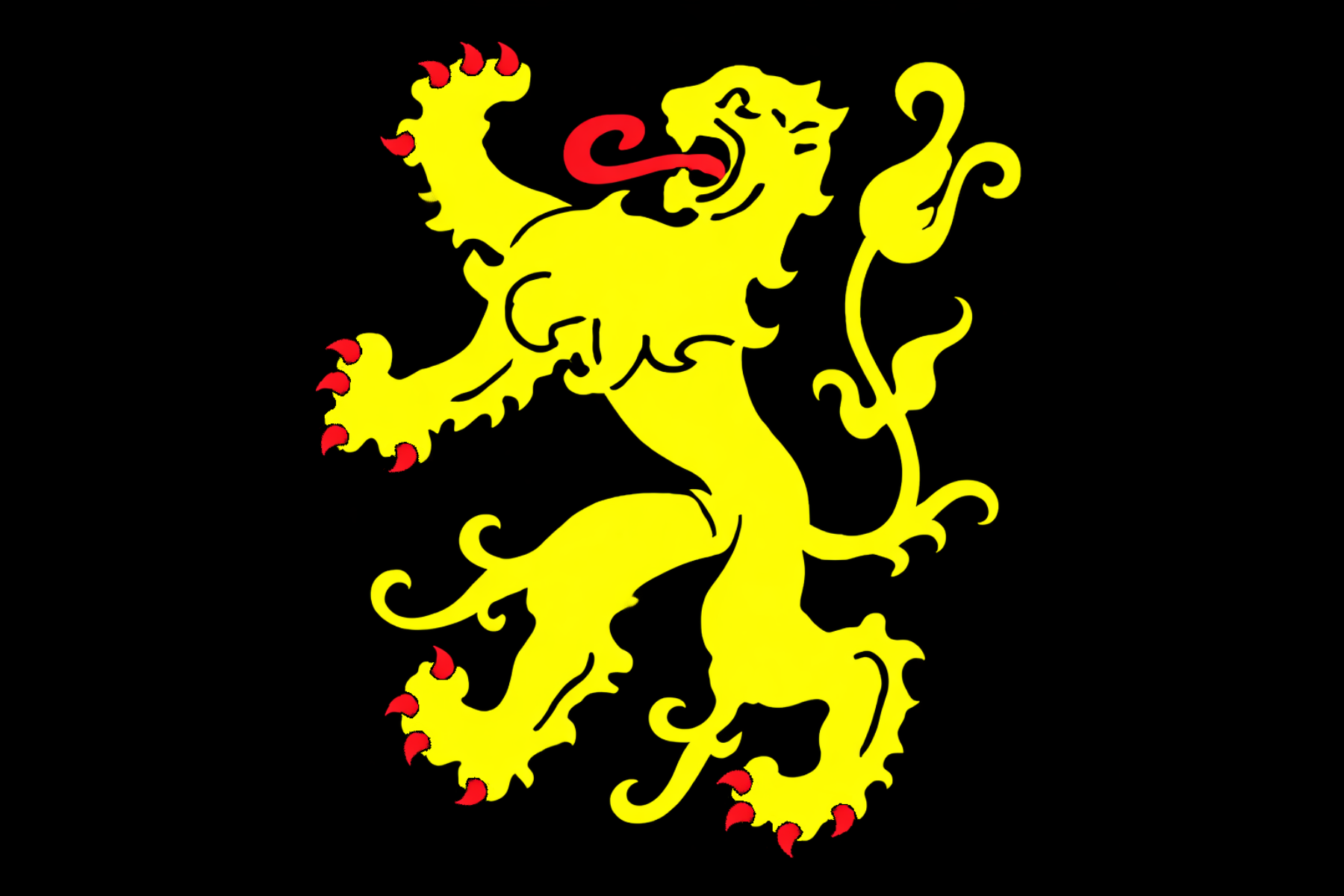
Old banner of Brabant

The old (unofficial) banner of Brabant was the (old) coat of arms of Brabant in flag form (or banner form). This was also the banner of the Duchy of Brabant (old style). It is a more simplistic design compared to the official flag of the province, and was mainly used by civilians of the province Brabant (and sometimes also Antwerp).

The description of the flag is as follows: "In black a lion of gold, nailed and tongued gules"

The old (unofficial) banner of Brabant, its design, refers to the historical coat of arms of the Duchy of Brabant, which featured a black lion with red claws and tongue (the Brabantian lion). The banner was previously (unofficially) used as the flag of the province of Brabant, but was later dropped when the province split into Flemish and Walloon Brabant in 1995.

== derived flags ==
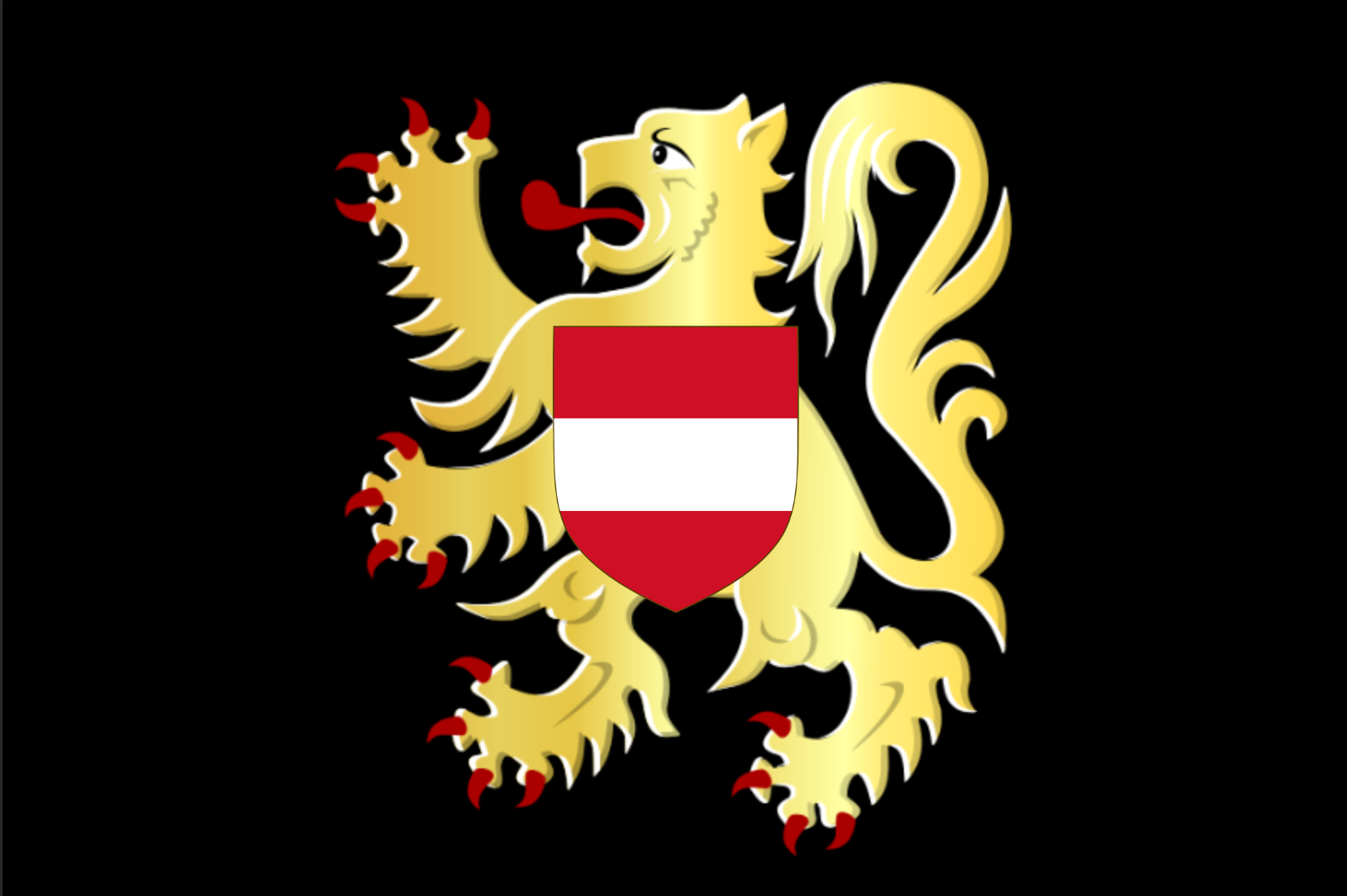
Flag of Flemish Brabant

=== Flemish Brabant ===
The flag of Flemish Brabant is based on the flag of the (former) Belgian province of Brabant, with the coat of arms of Leuven (the provincial capital) in the center.

The description of the flag is as follows: "In black a lion of gold, nailed and tongued gules bearing a shield of red with a white crossbar."

The flag of Flemish Brabant was adopted on 17 January 1995 and approved on 16 April 1996, after the split of the province of Brabant on 1 January 1995.

=== Walloon Brabant ===
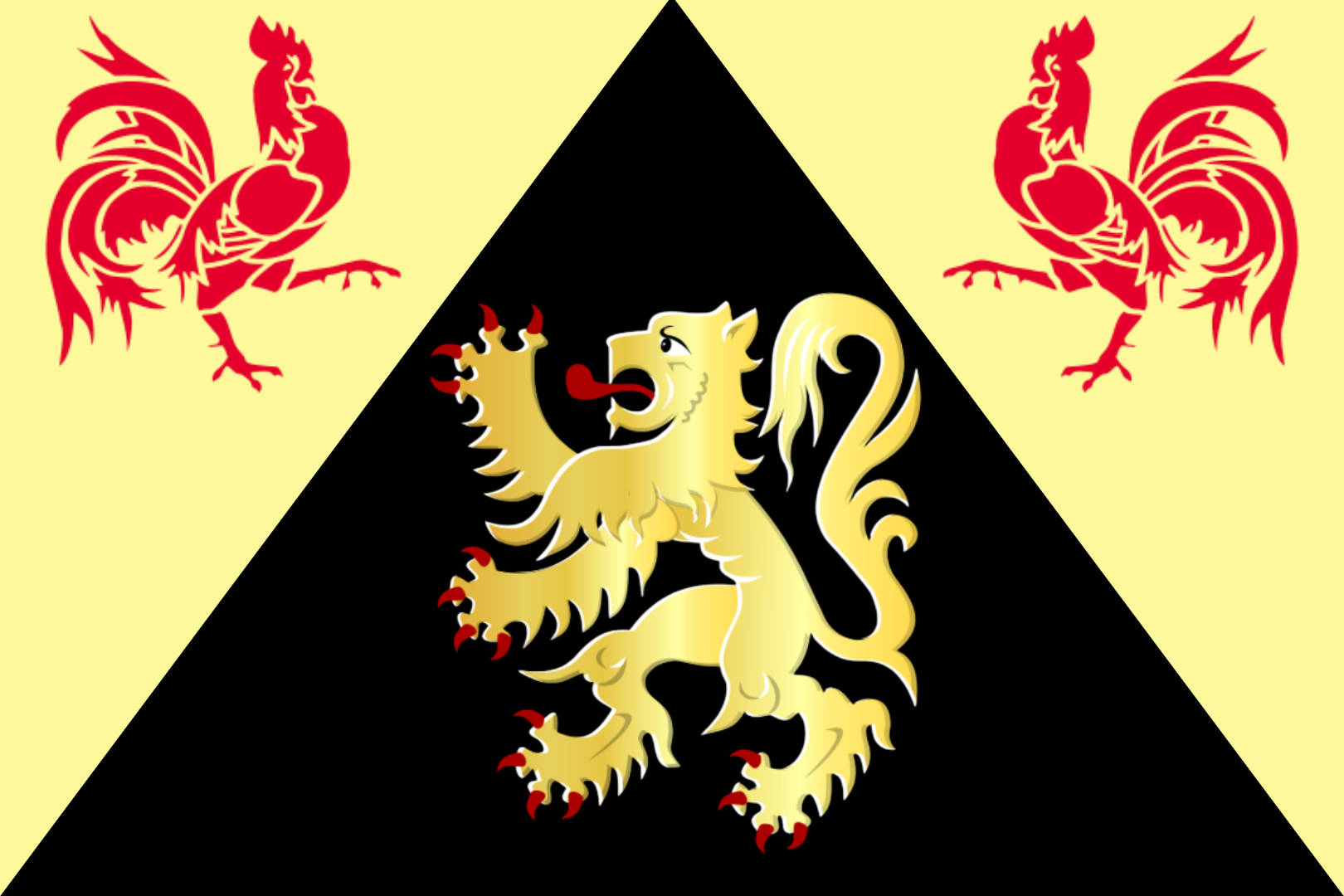
Flag of Walloon Brabant

The flag of Walloon Brabant (like the flag of Flemish Brabant) is based on the flag of the (former) Belgian province of Brabant and the flag of the Walloon Region, it features a central yellow lion with a red tongue and claws on a black background (the Brabantian lion), similar to the one on the flag of Flemish Brabant. A red Gallic rooster appears in each upper corner. This is a reference to the flag of the Walloon Region.

The description of the flag is as follows: "In black a lion of gold, nailed and tongued gules, hooded of gold charged with facing Walloon cocks gules"

The flag of Walloon Brabant was adopted on 2 January 1995, after the split of the province of Brabant on 1 January 1995.

== See also ==
- Flemish Brabant
- Walloon-Brabant
- Belgium
