= French Flanders =

Historical territory of Flanders in the present-day French region of Hauts-de-France

French Flanders Flandre française (French) Frans Vlaanderen (Dutch) Flande franchoèse (Picard)
- 862–1791
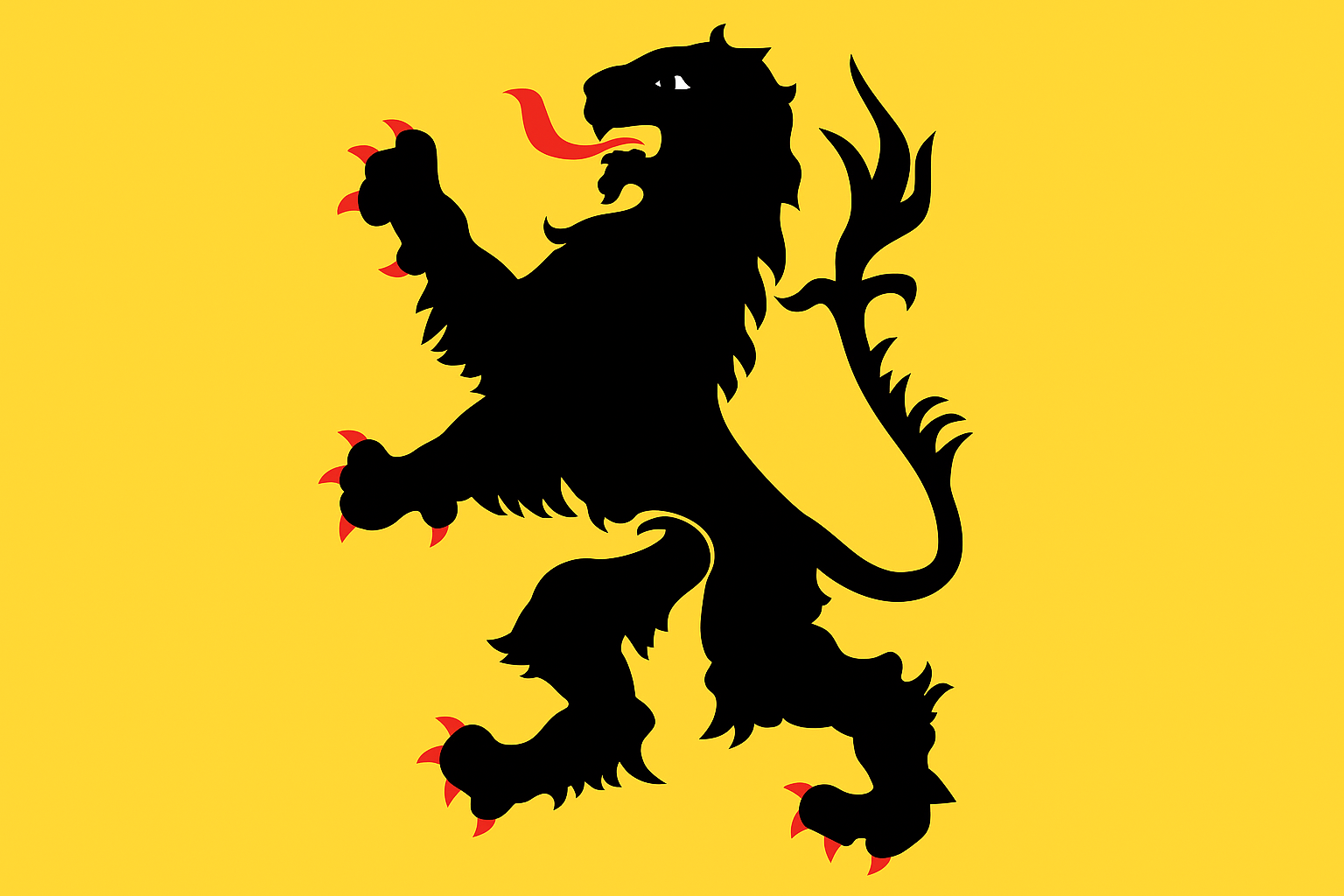
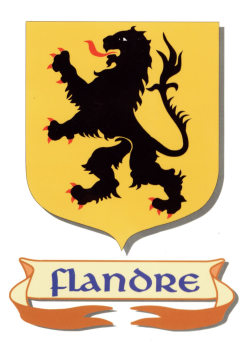
- Flag Coat of arms

- French Flanders in France (1789 borders)
- Capital: Lille
- Government
  - Type: Province
- King of West Francia / King of France
  - 862–877: Charles II
  - 1774–1791: Louis XVI
- Governor of Flanders and Hainaut
  - 1694–1711: Louis-François de Boufflers
  - 1787–1791: Charles Eugène Gabriel de La Croix
- History
  - County created: 862
  - Disestablished: 1791
Preceded by	Succeeded by
Kingdom of France	Nord
- Today part of: France

French Flanders is a historical and cultural region of France. It was historically part of the County of Flanders along with what are now the Belgian region of Flanders and the Dutch region of Zeelandic Flanders. Today about 20,000 people speak French Flemish, part of the Flemish dialect cluster of the Dutch language. The region lies in the modern-day northern French region of Hauts-de-France, and roughly corresponds to the arrondissements of Lille, Douai and Dunkirk on the northern border with Belgium. Together, with French Hainaut and Cambrésis, it makes up the French Department of Nord.

== History ==
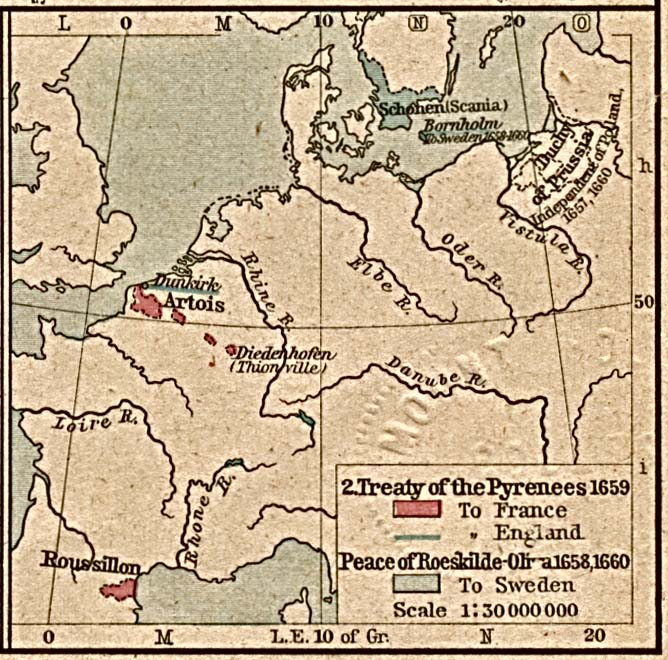
Territorial changes due to the Treaty of the Pyrenees (1659), including French Flanders

Once a part of ancient and medieval Francia from the inception of the Frankish kingdom (descended from the Empire of Charlemagne) under the Merovingian monarchs such as Clovis I, who was crowned at Tournai, Flanders gradually fell under the control of the English and then Spanish, becoming part of the Spanish Netherlands and retained by Spain at the end of the Eighty Years' War. When French national military power returned under the Bourbons with King Louis XIV "The Sun King" (1638–1715), a part of historically French Flanders was returned to the Kingdom.

The region now called "French Flanders" was once part of the feudal state County of Flanders, then part of the Southern Netherlands. It was separated from the county (part of Habsburgs' Burgundian inheritance) in 1659 due to the Peace of the Pyrenees, which ended the French-Spanish conflict in the Thirty Years War (1618–1648), and other parts of the region were added in successive treaties in 1668 and 1678. The region was ceded to the Kingdom of France, and became part of the province of Flanders and Hainaut. The bulk became part of the modern French administrative Nord department, although some western parts of the region, which separated in 1237 and became the County of Artois before the cession to France in 1659 with the treaty of Pyrenees, and is now part of Pas-de-Calais.

During World War II, 'French Flanders' referred to all of Nord-Pas de Calais, which was first attached to the military administration of German-occupied Belgium, then part of Belgien-Nordfrankreich under a Reichskommissar, and finally part of a theoretical Reichsgau of Flanders.

Rich in coal, facing the North Sea, bordered by usually powerful neighbors, French Flanders has been fought over numerous times in the thousand years between the Middle Ages and World War II.

== Geography ==
French Flanders is located in the northernmost part of France, within the Nord department of the Hauts-de-France region. Geographically, it is part of the larger historical region of Flanders, which also includes parts of modern-day Belgium and the Netherlands.

The landscape is predominantly flat and low-lying, consisting of fertile plains ideal for agriculture, especially crops like wheat, sugar beets, and chicory. The region includes two main areas:

1. Maritime Flanders (Westhoek) – Located along the North Sea coast, this area includes cities like Dunkirk and features sandy beaches, dunes, and port facilities.
2. Inland or Houtland Flanders (Walloon Flanders) – A rural and agricultural area with small towns such as Cassel, Hazebrouck, and Bailleul, known for its rolling hills, especially around Cassel, which stands on one of the few hills in the region.

The region has a temperate oceanic climate, with mild summers, cool winters, and frequent rainfall, influenced by its proximity to the North Sea. Several rivers, including the Lys and the Yser, cross the area, adding to its agricultural richness.

French Flanders geography has played a key role in its history, economy, and cultural development, making it a crossroads of European influences.

=== Major cities ===
- Lille
- Dunkirk (Dunkerque)
- Cassel

== Language ==
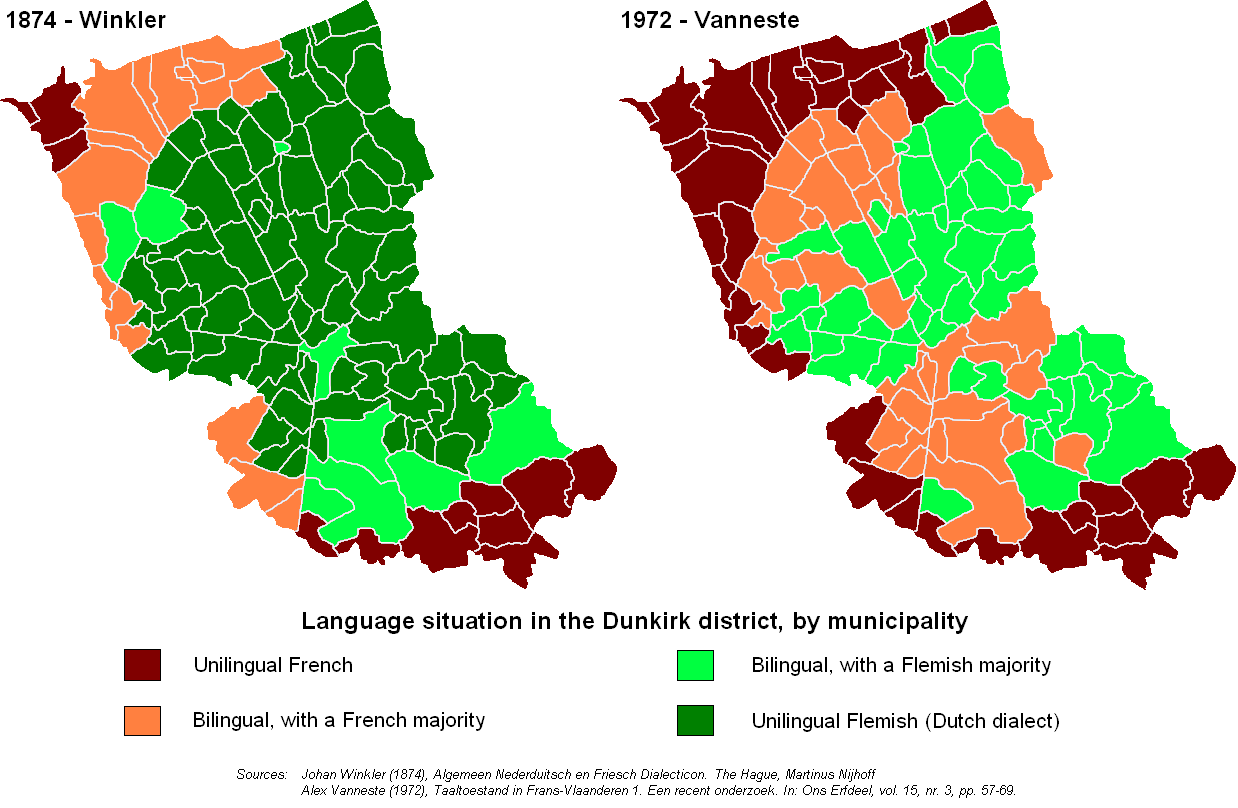
Language map of French Flanders

The primary language spoken today is French. However, the region has a strong historical and cultural connection to Flemish, specifically a local variety of West Flemish, which is a dialect of Dutch. This dialect, known as French Flemish, was traditionally spoken in rural areas, but its use has declined significantly and is now considered endangered. While some older generations still speak it, younger people mostly use French, and Flemish is not officially recognized as a regional language by the French government. Despite this, efforts are being made by cultural associations to preserve and promote the Flemish heritage of the region. French Flanders retains many Flemish influences in its place names, traditions, and architecture, reflecting its unique bilingual and bicultural history. The French Flemish subdialect is spoken by around 20,000 daily speakers and 40,000 occasional users. The traditional language of Walloon Flanders (part of Romance Flanders) is Picard (and its dialects, such as Ch'ti or Rouchi). Many schools in this region teach Flemish to schoolchildren, partially in an effort to revive the language.

== Culture ==
The culture of French Flanders, is a rich blend of French and Flemish traditions. The region is known for its distinctive red-brick architecture, stepped gables, and belfries, especially in towns like Lille, Dunkirk, and Cassel. Traditional festivals play a major role in local life, with events like the Carnival of Dunkirk and the famous giant puppet parades (géants du Nord) reflecting deep-rooted folklore. French Flanders also boasts a hearty regional cuisine, featuring dishes such as carbonade flamande (beef stew with beer), potjevleesch (a cold meat terrine), waffles, fries, Maroilles cheese, and a variety of local beers. The area has a strong sense of community, shaped by rural customs, religious traditions, and seasonal celebrations. Despite modern influences, many cultural associations and museums work to preserve the unique heritage and identity of this historically rich region.

In 2008, this part of France gained exposure to a wider international audience through the success of the movie Bienvenue chez les Ch'tis.

== Flag and Coat of arms ==
=== Flag ===
The flag of French Flanders is a regional symbol based on the traditional flag of the historic County of Flanders. It features a black lion with red claws and tongue on a yellow (gold) background. This design, known as the "Lion of Flanders," reflects the region’s Flemish heritage and is widely used to represent French Flanders culturally and historically, even though it is not an official flag recognized by the French government.

Flag	Date	Region	Description
	1659-now (unofficially)	French Flanders	in yellow with a black lion, red clawed and tongued

=== Coat of arms ===
The coat of arms of French Flanders is based on the historic arms of the medieval County of Flanders. It features a black lion standing upright (rampant) on a golden (yellow) shield, with red claws and a red tongue. Known as the "Lion of Flanders," this emblem reflects the region's deep Flemish heritage. Although not officially recognized by the French government today, it remains an important cultural and historical symbol, frequently used in local events, festivals, and representations of regional identity in French Flanders.

Coat of arms	Date	Region	Deschription
	1659-now (unofficially)	French Flanders	in yellow with a black lion, red clawed and tongued

== See also ==
- Flanders
- Belgium
- Wallonia
- Nord-Pas-de-Calais
- Nord department
