= Flag of Flanders =

Flag in region of Belgium

Flanders
- Flemish Lion (Vlaamse Leeuw)
- Proportion: 2∶3
- Adopted: 1973 (adopted by the Cultural Council for the Dutch Cultural Community); 1985 (ratified by the Flemish Parliament for the merged institutions)
- Design: Solid yellow with a black lion

The flag of Flanders, sometimes called Vlaamse Leeuw ("Flemish Lion") or leeuwenvlag ("Lion flag"), is the flag of the Flemish Community and Flemish Region in Belgium. The flag was officially adopted by the Cultural Council for the Dutch Cultural Community (Cultuurraad voor de Nederlandse Cultuurgemeenschap) in 1973, and later, in 1985, by its successor, the Flemish Parliament. In 1990, the coat of arms was also adopted as an official symbol.

== Design ==
The flag is described as: "Or, a lion rampant armed and langued Gules".

The lion is depicted standing on its hind legs and clawing, facing right, which is the viewer's left.

== History ==
=== History of the lion ===
Lions, and particularly "lions rampant", have featured prominently in the heraldry of many parts of the Low Countries since the Middle Ages including beyond the modern-day region of Flanders.

The Flemish lion derives from the coats of arms of the Counts of Flanders. Its first known appearance in the region is on a seal of Count Philip of Alsace, dating from 1163. The lion was inherited as a regional symbol on the arms of the Dukes of Burgundy who inherited the region in 1405 and subsequently the House of Habsburg who ruled until 1795. As part of the claims and counterclaims resulting from War of the Spanish Succession, the Flemish lion likewise featured in the arms of Kings of Spain until 1931 and in the arms of the kingdom of the Two Sicilies until 1860.

=== Symbol of the Flemish Community ===
In 1816 the Flemish lion became part of the coats of arms of the modern Belgian provinces of East Flanders and West Flanders that administer most of the territory of the former county.

After gaining cultural autonomy in 1972, the then Cultuurraad van de Nederlandse Cultuurgemeenschap (Cultural Council of the Dutch Cultural Community) voted the decree of 22 May 1973 adopting the Flemish lion as its official coat of arms. Shortly afterwards, the Cultuurraad also adopted a flag, which is the same as the coat of arms. The arms and flag were adopted by the Flemish Community (Decree of 30 March 1988) when it took over the attributions of the Cultuurraad.

== Historic flags ==
Flag of the County of Flanders

=== Graafschap Vlaanderen ===
The flag of the County of Flanders was the flag of what was then Flanders. The Lion was first used by Philip of Alsace in the 12th century as his personal coat of arms as Count of Flanders and was later also used by the County of Flanders itself, both as a coat of arms and as a flag/armorial banner.

The flag is described as: "Or, a lion rampant armed and langued Gules"

In the early years of the county, the lion was sometimes depicted as a completely black lion, without red accents, which is what the Flemish battle flag is derived from, but in later and more detailed versions, the Flemish lion was (almost) always depicted with red claws and tongue.

=== County of Flanders (old version) ===
Flag of the County of Flanders (old)

The first coat of arms of the County of Flanders wasn't a lion, but a popular background, featuring the colors blue and yellow with a red shield in the center. It was attributed to the legendary Liederik van Buc. It may have been derived from a misinterpreted decorative mount on the shield of the Flemish Count Willem Clito. This symbol was used until the 12th century, from which time onward, the Flemish lion increasingly became the symbol of the county.

The arms is described as: "Desired of twelve pieces of gold and azure, with a heart shield of gules"

Today, this coat of arms is the symbol of the Belgian province of West Flanders. It is identical to the province's flag, to demonstrate its historical ties with the County of Flanders, was introduced on May 27, 1997, and approved by the Flemish Minister of Culture.

== Variants ==
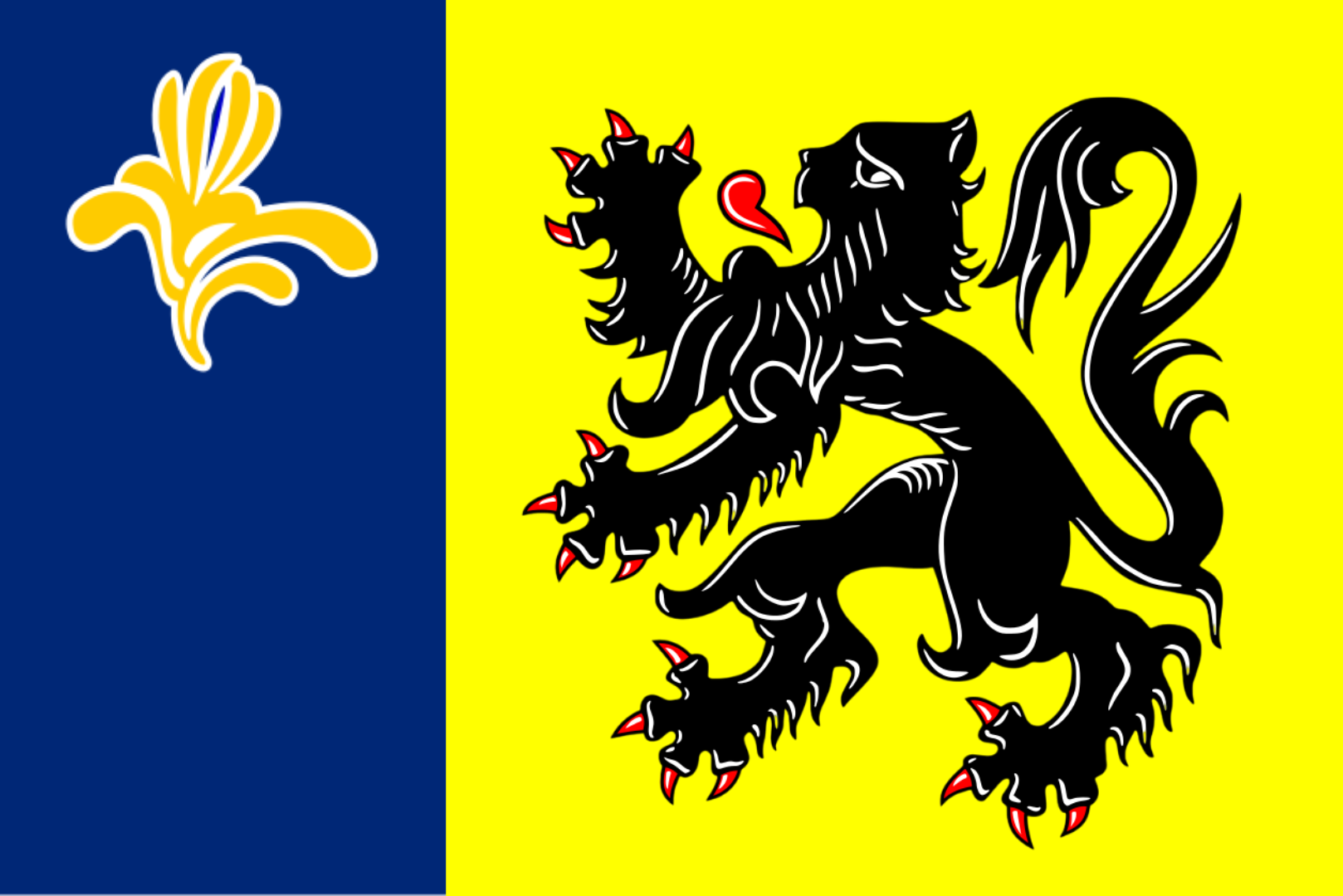
Flag of the Flemish Community Commission

=== Flemish Community Commission ===
The Flag of the Flemish Community Commission is the flag of the Flemish Community within the Brussels-Capital Region. It was adopted as the official flag of the Community Commission on December 4, 1992.

The flag is described as: "Yellow with a black lion, red clawed and tongued, with a blue vertical stripe along the trousers with a yellow iris with a white edge in the top of the trousers"

The Flemish flag is combined with the (old) flag of the Brussels Capital Region, to form that of the Flemish Community Commission.

== Flemish nationalism ==
A common version of the black-and-yellow "battle flag" generally associated with the radical Flemish Movement

The flag of Flanders is black on a yellow background with red tongue and claws meaning that it is includes all three colours of the flag of Belgium. More radical sections of the Flemish Movement have, since the mid-20th century, adopted versions of the flag which are solely yellow and black to symbolise their opposition to the Belgian nation-state. This version is sometimes referred to as the "battle flag" (strijdvlag).

Like many similar movements at the time, early flamingants sought to appropriate historical symbols to cultivate regional identity and patriotism. The renewed popularity of the Flemish lion in the early 19th century was primarily based on the popular historical novel The Lion of Flanders (1838) by Hendrik Conscience which re-imagined the Battle of the Golden Spurs on 11 July 1302 as a symbol of Flemish resistance against foreign oppression. Hippoliet van Peene wrote the anthem De Vlaamse Leeuw in 1847. By the late nineteenth century it was customary for supporters of the Flemish movement to fly the Flemish lion as a patriotic symbol on 11 July.

The controversy over the flag's colour emerged only after parts of the Flemish Movement adopted explicitly anti-Belgian stances in World War I and especially World War II. The Flemish SS promoted the use of the yellow-and-black flag and after the Allied liberation was widely associated with the Flemish Movement's collaboration with the Nazis in German-occupied Belgium. The divide has remained ever since. Officially and historically the Flemish lion should have a red tongue and claws, and while both flags used to be more or less interchangeable until 1973, the black-and-yellow flag is commonly associated today with separatist or far-right Flemish nationalism.

== Belgian flags with Flemish lion ==
Differen Belgian provinces have the Flemish lion within their flag or armorialbanner

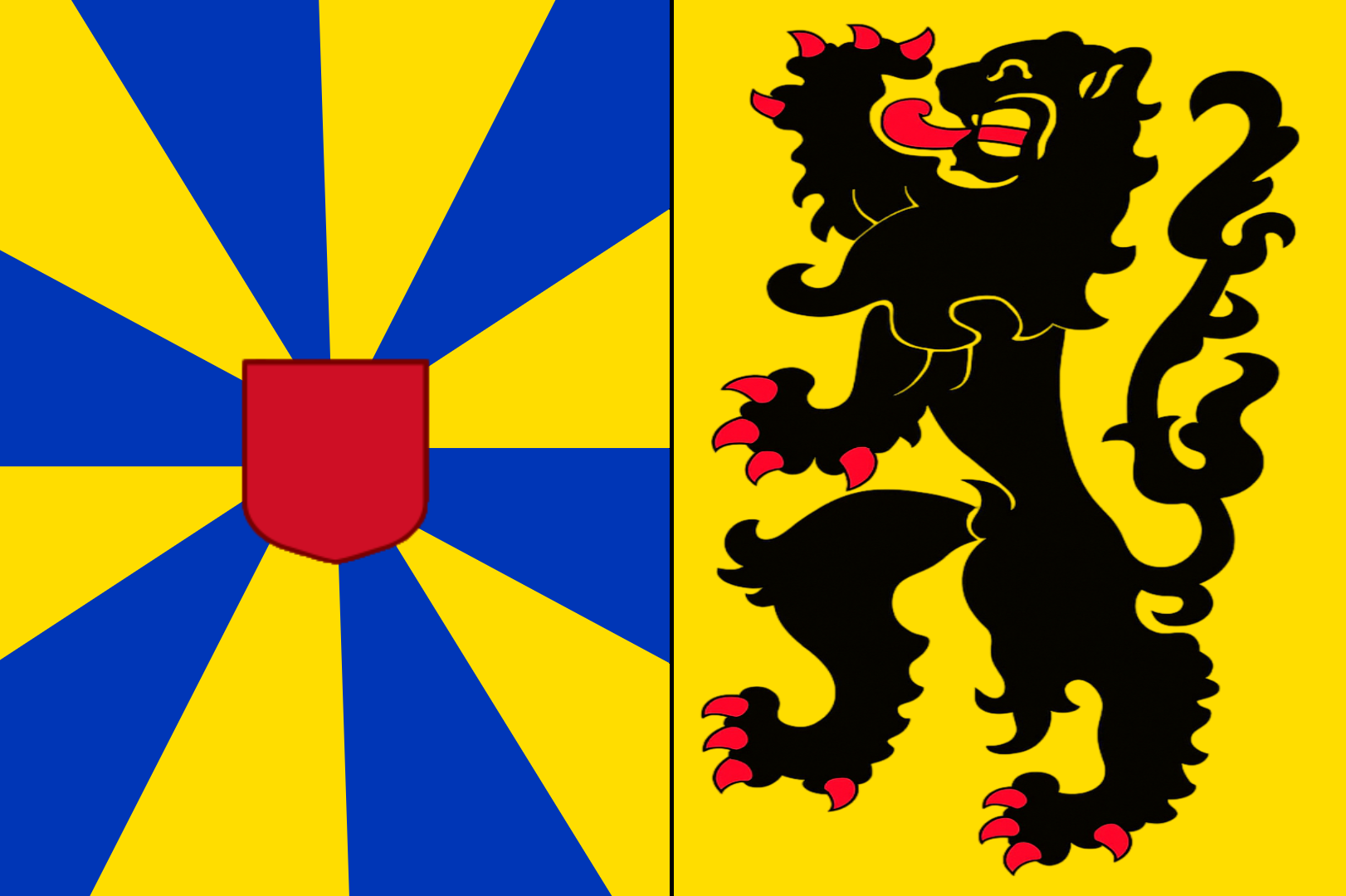
Banner of arms of West-Flanders

=== West-Flanders ===
The banner of arms of West Flanders was the old unofficial flag of the province West-Flanders and was the coat of arms of the province in flag form (or banner form).

The flag is described as: "Divided, on the left a coveted background of blue and yellow in twelve pieces, with in the center over the whole a heart shield of red and on the right in yellow a black lion with red tongue and claws"

The design of the old (unofficial) West Flanders armorialbanner refers to the historical coat of arms of the County of Flanders, which still used both sides of the coat of arms as its shields. The armorialbanner was previously (unofficially) used as the flag of West Flanders, but was later dropped when the official provincial flag was adopted in 1997.

Flag of East-Flanders

=== East-Flanders ===
The flag of East-Flanders, and the old armorialbanner of the province both have the Flemish lion on them.

The flag is described as: "In green, six white stripes and a black lion with four red claws and a red tongue"

The flag of East Flanders has a green background with four white stripes and a Flemish lion. The green background refers to the province's environmental friendliness, the four white stripes refer to the province's four major rivers, and the Flemish lion refers to the province's historical ties with the region (and county) of Flanders.

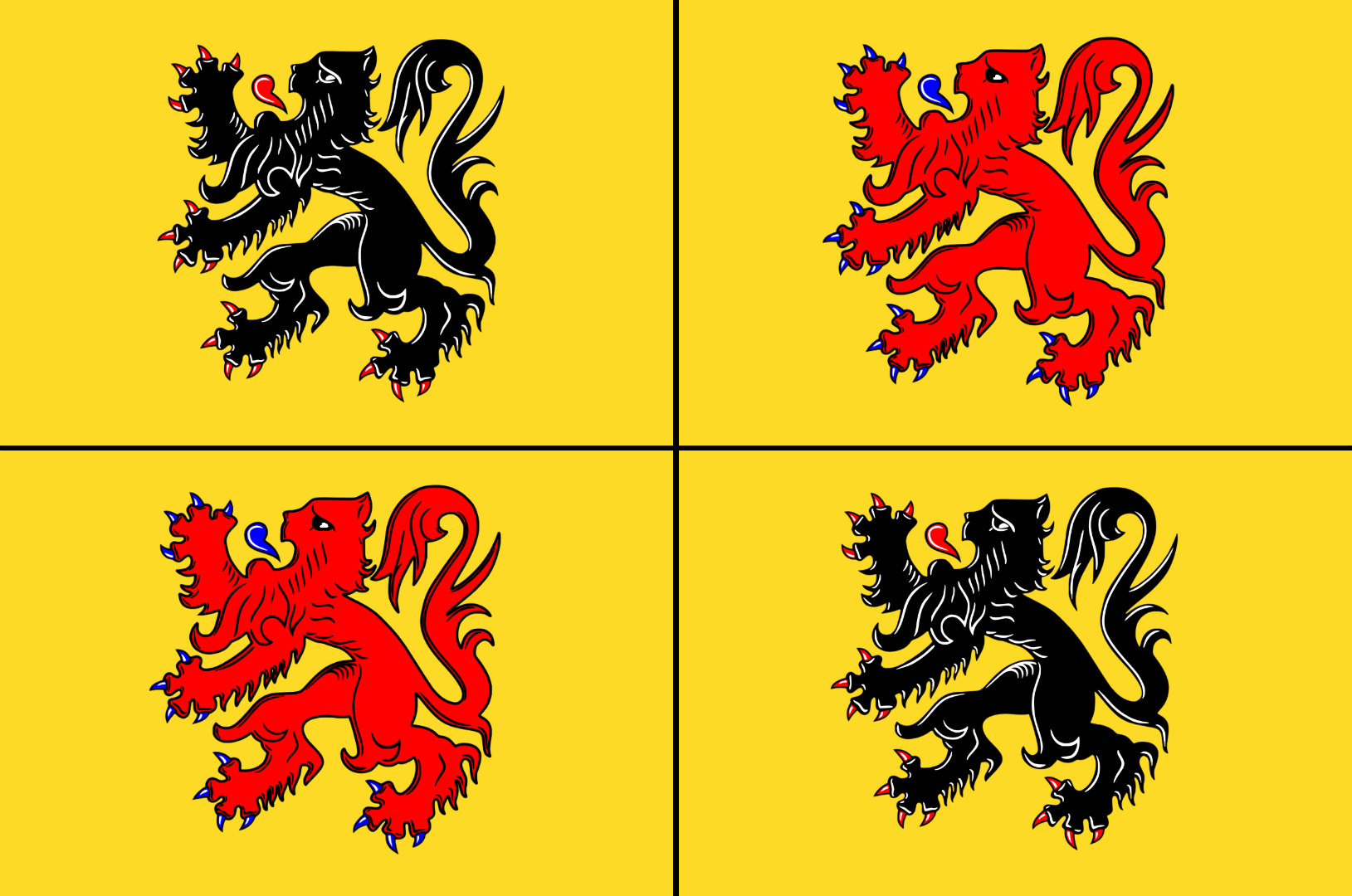
Flag of Hainaut

=== Hainaut ===
The flag of Hainaut has the Flemish lion on it, as the County of Hainaut used to have an identical flag to Flanders.

The flag is described as: "Four quarters, each with a lion. A black lion sable (top left and bottom right), a red lion gules (top right and bottom left)"

The flag of the County of Hainaut was a combination of the flag of Hainaut (identical to the flag of Flanders, the black lion with red claws and tongue) and the flag of Holland (the red lion with blue claws and tongue). This was because the Count of Hainaut was also Count of Holland. Later it became the (unofficial) flag of the province of Belgium in 1831.

== See also ==
- List of Belgian flags
- Flag of Belgium
- Flag of Wallonia
- Flag of the Brussels-Capital Region
- Flag of Brabant (Belgium)
