= Coat of arms of Walloon-Brabant =

Coat of arms of Waals-Brabant
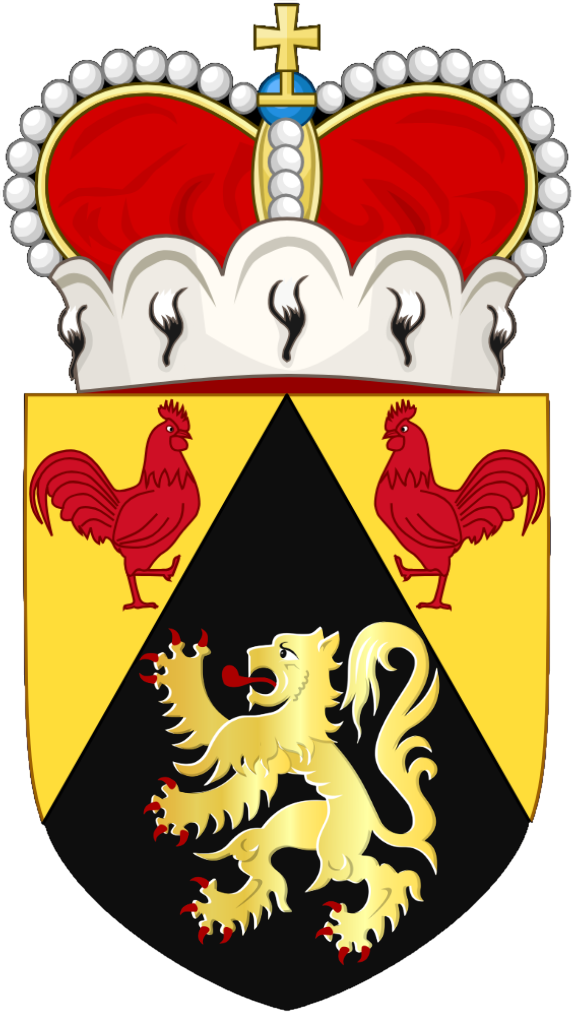
- Arms of Walloon-Brabant

Versions
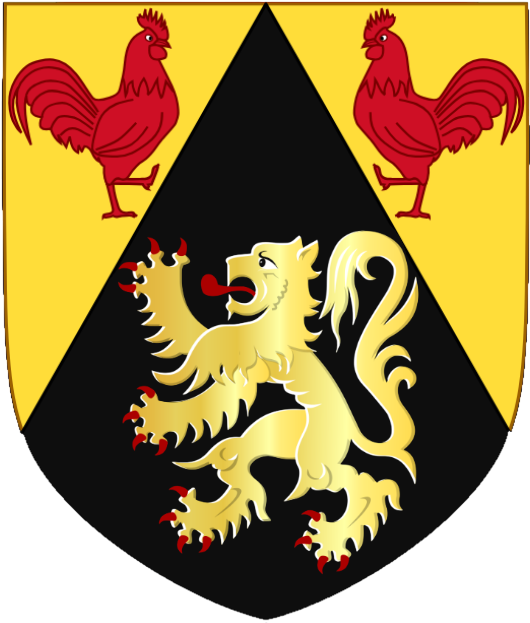
- Arms without crown
- Adopted: 1995

The coat of arms of Walloon Brabant symbolizes the province's historical and cultural heritage. It featurse a yellow lion with red claws and tongue on a black field (Leo Belgicus), representing the former province of Brabant and the Duchy of Brabant. and two red gallic roosters on a yellow background occupy the upper corners, symbolizing the Walloon region.

The coat of arms (and flag) of Walloon Brabant were officially adopted on 2 January 1995. After the division of the former province of Brabant, which split on 1 January 1995 into Flemish- and Walloon- Brabant.

The coat of arms is identical to the flag of Walloon-Brabant.

== Blazoning ==
The description of the Arms goals is as follows:

"Sable a lion of or (gold) armed and langued gules chaped in or (gold) with two roosters gules, the shield surmounted by a Ducal coronet"

The base is the same as the coat of arms of the Duchy and province of Brabant: a black shield with a golden lion with red tongue and nails (Leo Belgicus). The coat of arms of Walloon Brabant, however, has two golden triangles both charged with a red gallic roosters. The first field is charged with an inverted walking rooster and the second is charged with a walking rooster. On top of the shield is a prince's crown.

Flag of Walloon-Brabant

== Coat of arms ==
=== Arms of Walloon-Brabant ===
Flag	Date	Province	Use
	1995-Now	Walloon-Brabant	Coat of arms of Walloon-Brabant (Belgian province)
	1995-Now	Walloon-Brabant	Coat of arms of Walloon-Brabant (with crown) (Belgian province)

=== Historical Coats of arms of Walloon-Brabant ===
Flag	Date	Country/Province	Use
	1995-Now	Walloon-Brabant	Coat of arms of Walloon-Brabant (Belgian province)
	1815-1995	Brabant (province)	Coat of arms of the former Belgian province Brabant and Dutch province South Brabant
	1183-1795	Duchy of Brabant	Coat of arms of the Duchy of Brabant

=== Similar coats of arms to the coat of arms of Walloon-Brabant ===
Flag	Date	Region/Province	Use
	1998-Now	Walloon region	Coat of arms of the Walloon region (Belgian region)
	1995-Now	Flemish Brabant	Coat of arms of Flemish Brabant (Belgian province)

== See also ==
- Flag of Walloon-Brabant
- Walloon-Brabant
- Flemish-Brabant
- Province of Brabant
- Coat of arms of Belgium
