= Flag of Walloon-Brabant =

- Flag of Walloon-Brabant
- Proportion: 13:15
- Adopted: 2 January 1995
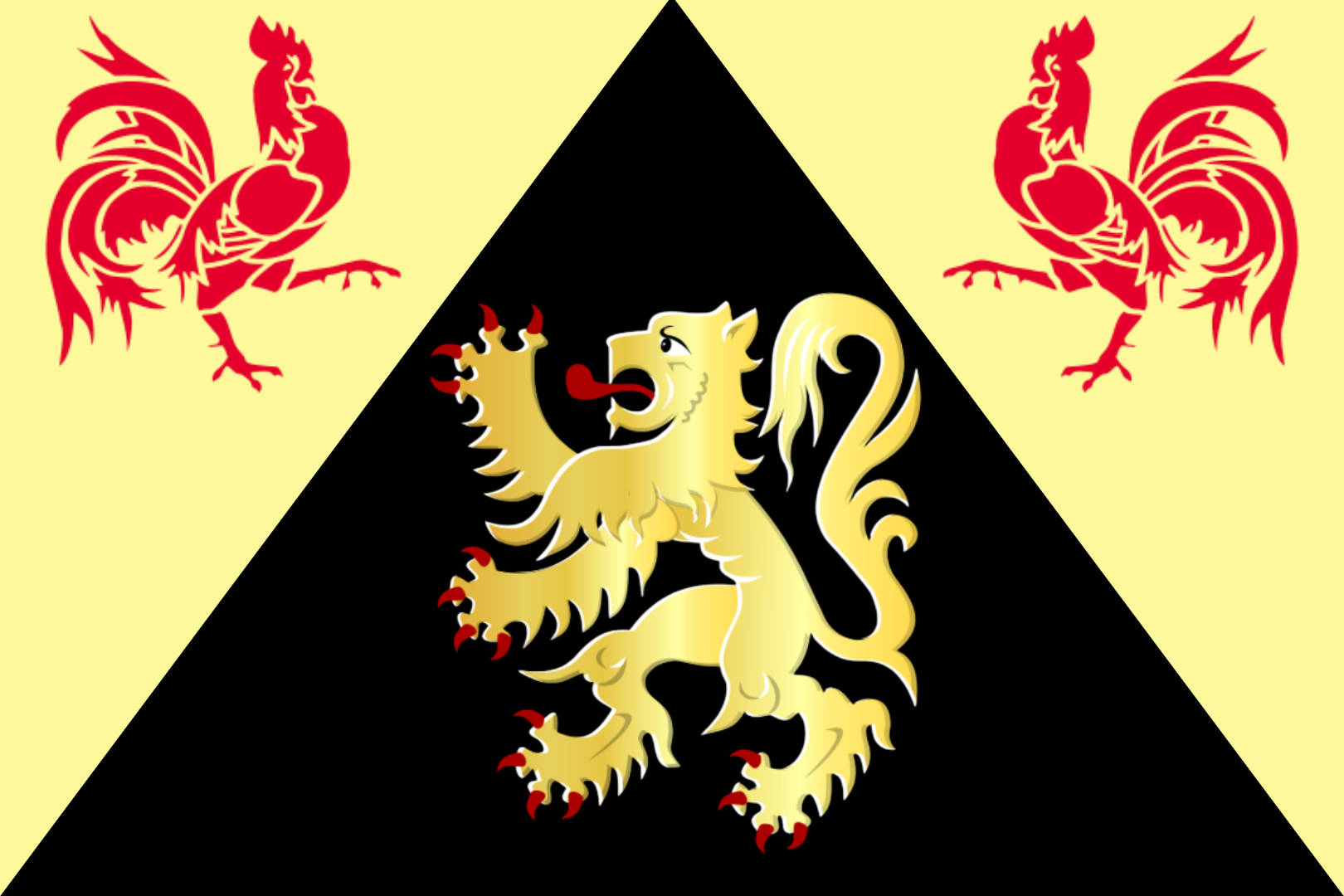
- Common variant of the flag with ratio 2:3

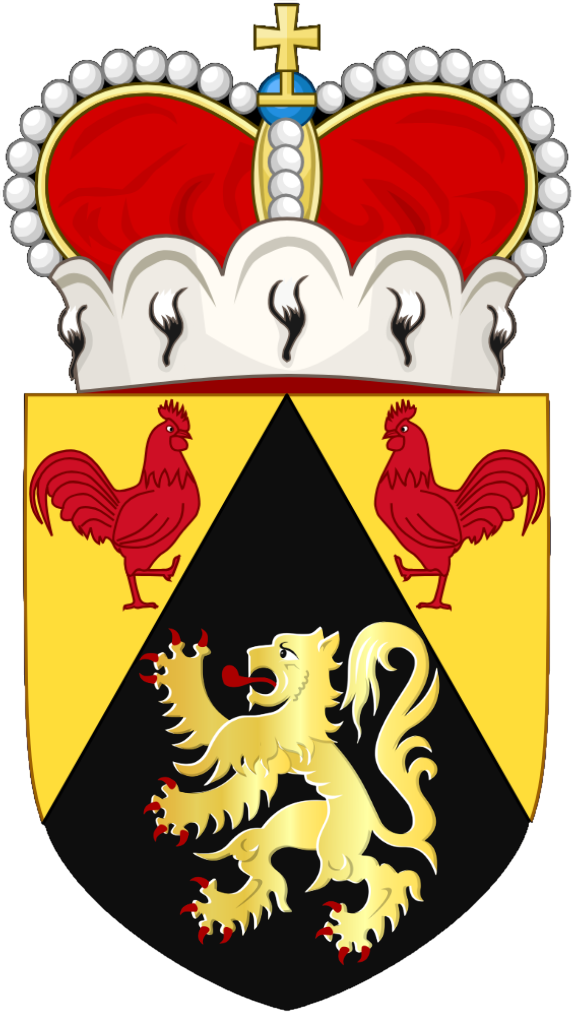
- Coat of arms of Walloon-Brabant

"Sable a lion or armed and langued gules chaped or two roosters gules, the shield surmounted by a Ducal coronet"

The flag of Walloon Brabant symbolizes the province's historical and cultural heritage. It features a yellow lion with red claws and tongue on a black field (Leo Belgicus), and two red gallic roosters on a yellow background occupy the upper corners.

The flag (and coat of arms) of Walloon Brabant were officially adopted on 2 January 1995. After the division of the former province of Brabant, which split on 1 January 1995 into Flemish- and Walloon- Brabant.

The Flag is identical to the Coat of arms of Walloon-Brabant

== Flags ==
=== Flags of Walloon-Brabant ===
Flag	Date	Province/leader	Use
	1995-Now	Walloon-Brabant	Flag of Walloon-Brabant (Belgian province)
	1995-Now	Walloon-Brabant	Flag of Walloon-Brabant (common variant with ratio 2:3)
	1995-Now	Walloon-Brabant governor	Flag of the governor Walloon-Brabant

=== Historical flags of Walloon-Brabant ===
Flag	Date	Country/Province	Use
	1995-Now	Walloon-Brabant	Flag of Walloon-Brabant (Belgian province)
	1815-1995	Brabant (province)	Flag of the former Belgian province Brabant (before split in 1995)
	1183-1795	Duchy of Brabant	Flag of the Duchy of Brabant

=== Similar flags to the flag of Walloon-Brabant ===
Flag	Date	Region/Province	Similarities
	1995-Now	Flemish-Brabant	"Golden lion with red gules and tongue" (Brabantian Lion)
	1998-Now	Wallonia	"A red gallic rooster on a yellow background"

== See also ==
- Walloon-Brabant
- Flemish Brabant
- Province of Brabant
- Belgium
- Flag of Belgium
- Duchy of Brabant
