= Coat of arms of Flanders =

- Coat of arms of the Flemish Community and the Flemish Region
- Alternative names: De Vlaamse Leeuw (the Flemish Lion)
- Adopted: 1990

The coat of arms of the Flemish Community is a heraldic symbol used by Flanders, Belgium. Although the lion has been in use for almost nine hundred years as the arms of the Count of Flanders, it only became the official symbol of the Flemish Community in 1973. At present its form and use is subject to the Decree of 7 November 1990.

== Design ==
The arms is described as: "Or, a lion rampant armed and langued Gules".

The lion is depicted in black on a yellow background standing on its hind legs and clawing, facing heraldic right, which is the viewer's left. The coat of arms does not have a motto. It also lacks external decorations.

== History ==
The fabricated old arms of the counts of Flanders

=== Old arms ===
The lion was the first coat of arms of the Count of Flanders and was created in the 12th century. When later historiographers depicted counts of an earlier epoch they fabricated an earlier version of the coat of arms: a shield of twelve azure (blue) and gold (yellow) pieces, with a gules (red) heart shield (like the modern West Flemish provincial flag). This coat of arms was attributed to Liederik, according to forest master legend, the progenitor of the Flemish counts. The coat of arms likely derives from a misinterpreted decorative mount on the shield of the Flemish Count Willem Clito (1102-1128), as depicted on his tomb in the Abbey of Saint-Bertinus in Saint-Omer. That shield features a central umbo (ornamental knob) from which several rays radiate towards the shield edges. In his search for the old coat of arms of Flanders, the 14th-century Abbot Iperius, biographer of the Flemish House of Counts, interpreted this as a shield with a gules heart shield; The colors—which he must have added himself—are probably those of the French royal family. Today, this coat of arms is the symbol of the Belgian province of West Flanders. It is identical to the province's flag, to demonstrate its historical ties with the County of Flanders, was introduced on May 27, 1997, and approved by the Flemish Minister of Culture.

=== History of the lion ===
The coat of arms of the counts of Flanders

The Flemish lion derives from the arms of the Counts of Flanders. Its first appearance is on a seal of Count Philip of Alsace, dating from 1163. As such they constitute the oldest of the many territorial arms bearing a lion in the Low Countries. Still, Count Philip was not the first of his line to bear a lion, for his cousin, William of Ypres, already used a seal with a lion passant in 1158; and the shield on the enamel effigy of about 1155 from the tomb of his maternal uncle, Geoffrey Plantagenet, Count of Anjou, bears numerous lions rampant. In the early years of the county, the lion was sometimes depicted as a completely black lion, without red accents, which is what the Flemish battle flag is derived from, but in later and more detailed versions, the Flemish lion was (almost) always depicted with red claws and tongue.

When the county of Flanders was inherited by the Dukes of Burgundy in 1405, the Flemish lion was placed on an escutcheon in their dynastic arms. It passed with the rest of the Burgundian inheritance to the House of Habsburg in 1482. The Habsburgs would bear the title and arms of the county of Flanders until 1795. As part of the claims and counterclaims resulting from War of the Spanish Succession, the Flemish lion likewise featured in the arms of Kings of Spain until 1931 and in the arms of the kingdom of the Two Sicilies until 1860.

=== Symbol of the Flemish Community ===
In 1816 the Flemish lion became part of the coats of arms of the modern Belgian provinces of East Flanders and West Flanders that administer most of the territory of the former county.

After gaining cultural autonomy in 1972, the then Cultuurraad van de Nederlandse Cultuurgemeenschap (Cultural Council of the Dutch Cultural Community) voted the decree of 22 May 1973 adopting the Flemish lion as its official coat of arms. Shortly afterwards, the Cultuurraad also adopted a flag, which is the same as the coat of arms. The arms and flag were adopted by the Flemish Community (Decree of 30 March 1988) when it took over the attributions of the Cultuurraad.

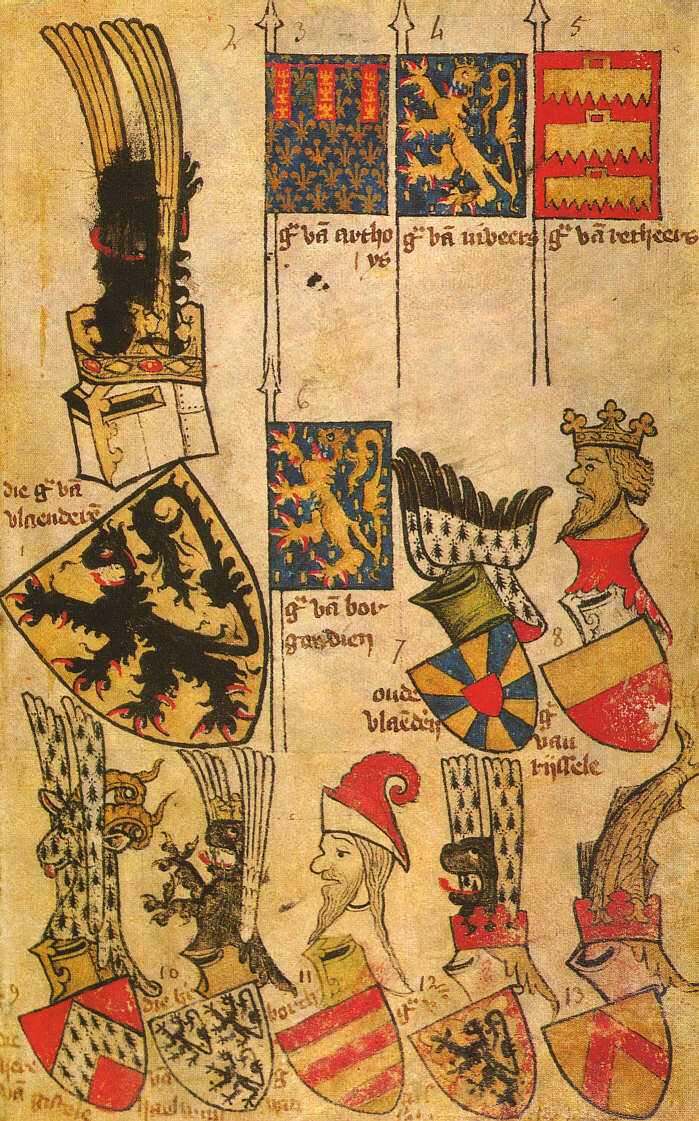
Folio 80 recto of the Gelre armorial, with (center left) the coat of arms of Flanders and, to the right of it, in the center, the old coat of arms of Flanders with the twelve pieces in gold and azure.

== Color of the Claws and tongue ==
There is discussion within the Flemish movement whether the tongue and claws of the Flemish lion should be red or black.

Like many other nationalist movements, the Flemish movement sought and appropriated historical symbols as an instrument for rallying support. The choice of the Flemish lion was primarily based on the popular historical novel De leeuw van Vlaanderen (1838) of Hendrik Conscience, that forged the Battle of the Golden Spurs of 11 July 1302 into an icon of Flemish resistance against foreign oppression. It was enhanced even further when Hippoliet van Peene wrote the anthem De Vlaamse Leeuw in 1847. By the late nineteenth century it was customary for supporters of the Flemish movement to fly the Flemish lion on 11 July.

But the controversy over the color of the claws and tongue originated when part of the Flemish movement started to take an increasingly anti-Belgian stand after the First World War and even more after the second world war, after the Flemish SS promoted the use of the full black lion and after the war was seen as the symbol of collaboration with the nazis. The radicalized resented that the colours of the Flemish lion echoed those of the Belgian flag (black, yellow and red) and therefore propagated a black lion with black tongue and claws. The divide has remained ever since. Officially and historically the Flemish lion should have a red tongue and claws, and while both flags used to be more or less interchangeable until 1973 the entirely black lion has come to stand for the separatist or otherwise radical sections of Flemish nationalism in the eyes of many.

== Coat of arms of Flemish provinces ==
=== Coat of arms of West-Flanders ===
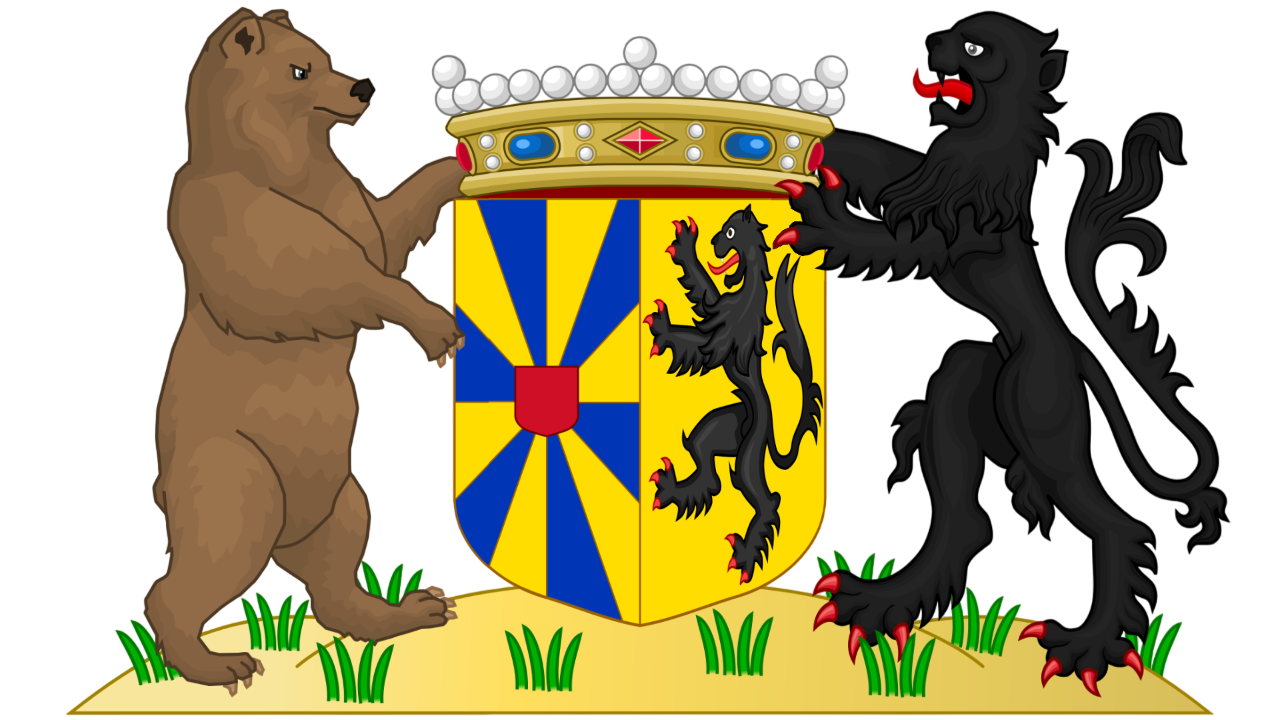

Shared
1. Desired of twelve pieces of gold and azure, with a heart shield of gules
2. in gold a lion of sable, clawed and tongued gules.
The shield topped with a count's crown with thirteen pearls, three of which are raised and held on the right by a bear of natural colour and on the left by a lion of sable, clawed and tongued gules. The whole placed on a dune ground of natural colour covered with marram grass.

— Provincial Council Decree: 27.3.1997 Ministerial Decree: 27.5.1997 Belgian Official state paper: 12.7.1997

The coat of arms of the province of West Flanders is the coat of arms of Flanders crossed with the old coat of arms of Flanders as mentioned in the coat of arms book Gelre, surrounded by external ornaments. The coat of arms is topped with a count's crown and has a bear and a lion as shield holders. It stands on a dune ground.

=== Coat of arms of East-Flanders ===

in gold a lion sable, clawed and tongued gules; the shield surmounted by a count's coronet with thirteen pearls, three of which are raised, and held by two lions sable, clawed and tongued gules; the whole placed on a plinth of three steps of silver.

— Coat of arms and flag of East Flanders

The coat of arms of the province of East Flanders is the coat of arms of Flanders surrounded by external ornaments. The coat of arms is topped with a count's crown and has two lions as shield holders. It stands on a pedestal.

=== United Kingdom of the Netherlands ===
During the United Kingdom of the Netherlands reign over these two provinces (West and East Flanders), both their provincial coats of arms had a count's crown and a chief containing the partial coat of arms of Nassau ant their own coat of arms on the bottom (underneath the arms of Nassau).

Coat of arms of West Flanders (1815-1830)

Coat of arms of East Flanders (1815-1830)

== See also ==
- Flag of Flanders
- Coat of arms of Belgium

== Bibliography ==
- De Maesschalck, Edward (2019). De Graven van Vlaanderen (861-1384) [The Counts of Flanders (861-1384)] (in Dutch) (2nd ed.). DavidsFonds / Standaard uitgeverij. ISBN 9789002268458.
