= West Flanders =

Province of Belgium

West Flanders West-Vlaanderen (Dutch) West-Vloandern (West Flemish)
- Province
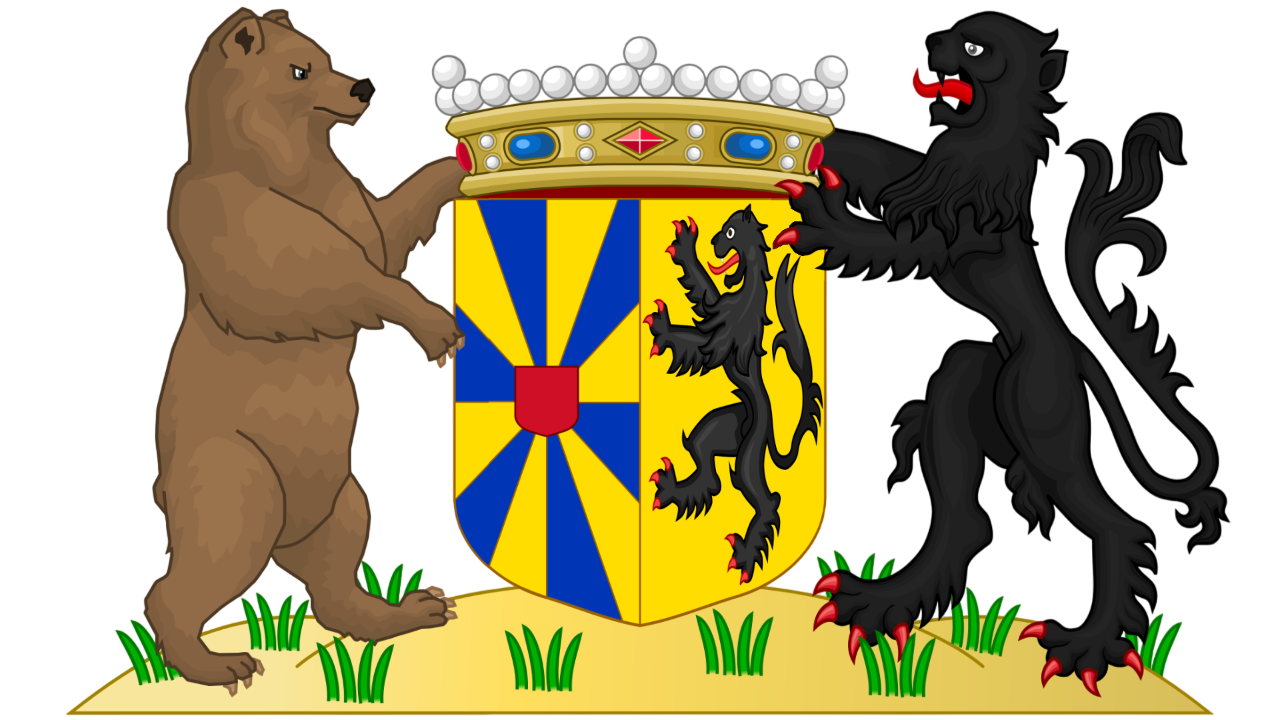
- Flag Coat of arms Brandmark

- Interactive map of West Flanders
- Coordinates: 51°00′N 03°00′E
- Country: Belgium
- Region: Flanders
- Capital (and largest city): Bruges

Government
  - Governor: Carl Decaluwé

Area
  - Total: 3,197 km^{2} (1,234 sq mi)

Population (1 January 2024)
  - Total: 1,226,375
  - Density: 383.6/km^{2} (993.5/sq mi)

GDP
  - Total: €64.564 billion (2024)
  - Per capita: €52,321 (2024)
- ISO 3166 code: BE-VWV
- HDI (2021): 0.940 very high · 5th of 11
- Website: www.west-vlaanderen.be

West Flanders (Note: Dutch: West-Vlaanderen [ˌʋɛst ˈflaːndərə(n)]; (Note: Vlaanderen in isolation: [ˈvlaːndərə(n)].) West Flemish: West-Vloandern [βæst ˈflɒːndərn̩]; French: Flandre-Occidentale [flɑ̃dʁ ɔksidɑ̃tal]; German: Westflandern [ˈvɛstˌflandɐn]) is the westernmost province of the Flemish Region, in Belgium. It is the only coastal Belgian province, facing the North Sea to the northwest. It has land borders with the Dutch province of Zeeland to the northeast, the Flemish province of East Flanders to the east, the Walloon province of Hainaut in the south and the French department of Nord to the west. Its capital is Bruges (Brugge). Other important cities are Kortrijk in the south and Ostend (Oostende) on the coast, Roeselare and Ypres (Ieper). The province has an area of 3,197 km^{2} (1,234 sq mi) which is divided into eight administrative districts (arrondissementen) containing 64 municipalities. As of January 2024, West Flanders has a population of over 1.22 million.

The North Sea coast of Belgium, an important tourism destination, lies in West Flanders. The Coast Tram line runs the length of the coast, from De Panne on the French border to Knokke-Heist on the Dutch border. West Flanders has two seaports, the Port of Zeebrugge and the Port of Ostend.

== Geography ==
West Flanders consists of the North Sea coast, followed by a very flat polder landscape. Only in the south are some small hills, with the Kemmelberg (159 m (522 ft)) being the highest point in the province. The Leie and IJzer are the main rivers. West Flanders is the only Belgian province that borders both France and The Netherlands; it is one of the only two provinces not landlocked, the other being Antwerp Province.

== Economy ==
The Gross domestic product (GDP) of the province was 46.9 billion € in 2018. GDP per capita adjusted for purchasing power was €34,700 or 115% of the EU27 average in the same year.

In the north of the province, most industry is concentrated in and around the cities of Bruges and Ostend. Both cities also have important seaports: the port of Bruges-Zeebrugge and the port of Ostend.

The south is known for its textile industry, with companies such as Beaulieu and Libeco-Lagae. The region around Kortrijk is called the "Dallas of Belgium" for its entrepreneurship.

== Tourism ==
Tourism is also an important industry in West Flanders. Major touristic attractions include the Belgian coast, the historic center of Bruges, the Yser Tower in Diksmuide and Flanders Fields, the World War I battlefields around Ypres.

== Language ==
A Dutch dialect called West Flemish is spoken here.

== Sport ==
The city of Bruges has two clubs playing at the highest level of football in Belgium (Belgian First Division A), namely Club Brugge and Cercle Brugge.

Other cities with teams playing at the highest level are Kortrijk (KV Kortrijk), Ostend (KV Oostende) and Waregem (Zulte Waregem).

The teams Knack Randstad Roeselare and Prefaxis Menen play in the highest volleyball league. Knack Randstad Roeselare also plays in the CEV Champions League, the European Championsleague.

BC Oostende is a basketball team which plays in the major basketball league of Belgium.

== List of governors ==
- 1830–1831 : Felix de Muelenaere (Catholic Party)
- 1832–1834 : Felix de Muelenaere (Catholic Party)
- 1836–1849 : Felix de Muelenaere (Catholic Party)
- 1849–1857 : Adolphe de Vrière (Liberal)
- 1857–1877 : Benoît Vrambout (Liberal)
- 1877–1878 : Léon Ruzette (Catholic Party)
- 1878–1883 : Theodore Heyvaert (Liberal)
- 1883–1884 : Guillaume De Brouwer (Liberal)
- 1884–1901 : Léon Ruzette (Catholic Party)
- 1901 : Jean-Baptiste de Bethune (Catholic Party)
- 1901–1903 : Charles d'Ursel (Catholic Party)
- 1903–1907 : Jean-Baptiste de Bethune (Catholic Party)
- 1907–1912 : Albéric Ruzette (Catholic Party)
- 1912–1933 : Léon Janssens de Bisthoven
- 1933–1940 : Henri Baels (Catholic Party)
- 1940–1944 : Michel Bulckaert
- 1944–1979 : Pierre van Outryve d'Ydewalle (CVP)
- 1979 : Leo Vanackere (CVP)
- 1979–1997 : Olivier Vanneste (CVP)
- 1997–2012 : Paul Breyne (CVP/CD&V)
- February 2012– : Carl Decaluwé (CD&V)

== Subdivisions ==
=== Arrondissements ===
The Province of West Flanders is divided into 8 administrative arrondissements.

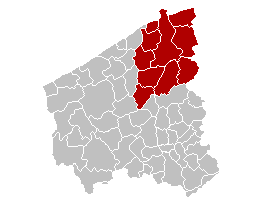
Bruges

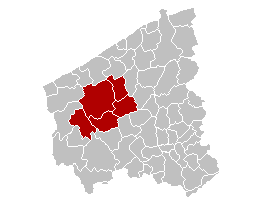
Diksmuide

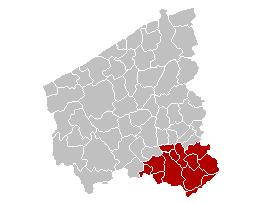
Kortrijk

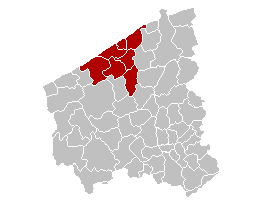
Ostend

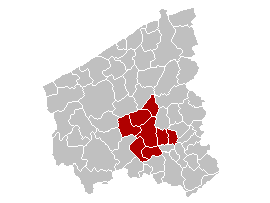
Roeselare

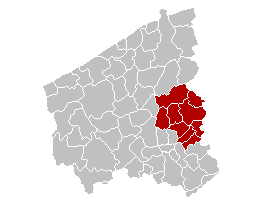
Tielt

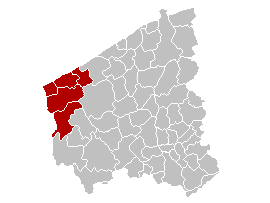
Veurne

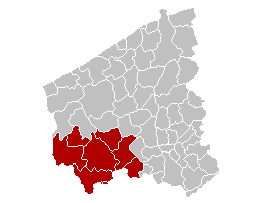
Ypres

=== Judicial arrondissements ===
The Province of West Flanders is divided into 4 judicial arrondissements.

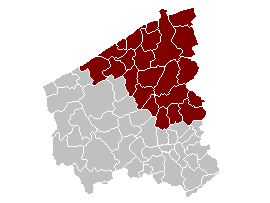
Bruges

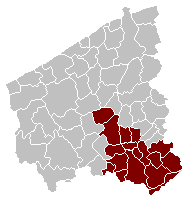
Kortrijk

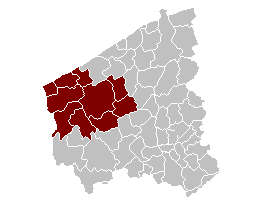
Veurne

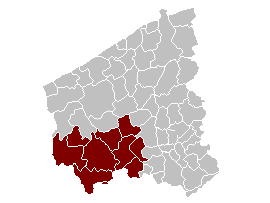
Ypres

=== Municipalities ===
Map of the municipalities in West Flanders

West Flanders contains 62 municipalities.

Municipalities that have city status have (city) after their names.

1. Alveringem
2. Anzegem
3. Ardooie
4. Avelgem
5. Beernem
6. Blankenberge (city)
7. Bredene
8. Bruges (city)
9. Damme (city)
10. De Haan
11. De Panne
12. Deerlijk
13. Dentergem
14. Diksmuide (city)
15. Gistel (city)
16. Harelbeke (city)
17. Heuvelland
18. Hooglede
19. Houthulst
20. Ichtegem
21. Ypres (Ieper) (city)
22. Ingelmunster
23. Izegem (city)
24. Jabbeke
25. Knokke-Heist
26. Koekelare
27. Koksijde
28. Kortemark
29. Kortrijk (city)
30. Kuurne
31. Langemark-Poelkapelle
32. Ledegem

33. Lendelede
34. Lichtervelde
35. Lo-Reninge (city)
36. Menen (city)
37. Mesen (city)
38. Meulebeke -> Tielt
39. Middelkerke
40. Moorslede
41. Nieuwpoort (city)
42. Ostend (city)
43. Oostkamp
44. Oostrozebeke
45. Oudenburg (city)
46. Pittem
47. Poperinge (city)
48. Roeselare (city)
49. Ruiselede -> Wingene
50. Spiere-Helkijn
51. Staden
52. Tielt (city)
53. Torhout (city)
54. Veurne (city)
55. Vleteren
56. Waregem (city)
57. Wervik (city)
58. Wevelgem
59. Wielsbeke
60. Wingene
61. Zedelgem
62. Zonnebeke
63. Zuienkerke
64. Zwevegem

== See also ==
- Transport Office of the Devastated Territories of West Flanders
- Flag and Coat of arms of West-Flanders
