= Walloon Brabant =

Province in Wallonia, Belgium

Walloon Brabant Brabant wallon (French) Roman Payis (Walloon)
- Province of Belgium
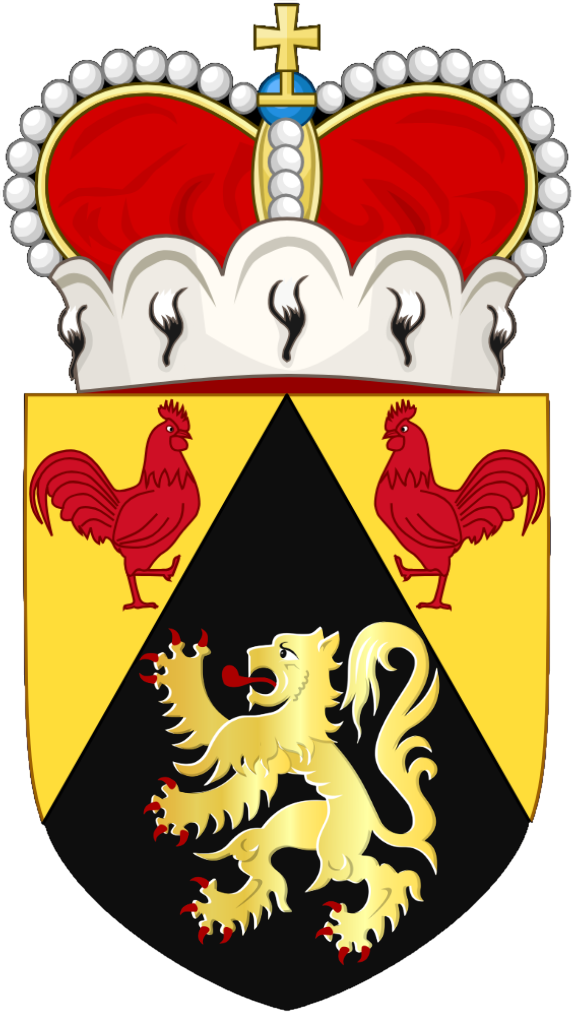
- Flag Coat of arms Brandmark

- Interactive map of Walloon Brabant
- Coordinates: 50°40′N 04°35′E
- Country: Belgium
- Region: Wallonia
- Capital: Wavre
- Largest town: Braine-l'Alleud

Government
  - Governor: Gilles Mahieu

Area
  - Total: 1,097 km^{2} (424 sq mi)

Population (1 January 2024)
  - Total: 414,130
  - Density: 377.5/km^{2} (977.8/sq mi)

GDP
  - Total: €28.893 billion (2024)
  - Per capita: €69,454 (2024)
- ISO 3166 code: BE-WBR
- HDI (2021): 0.951 very high · 2nd
- Website: Official site

Walloon Brabant (French: Brabant wallon [bʁabɑ̃ walɔ̃]; Dutch: Waals-Brabant [ˌʋaːlz ˈbraːbɑnt]; Walloon: Roman Payis) is a province located in Belgium's French-speaking region of Wallonia. It borders on (clockwise from the North) the province of Flemish Brabant (Flemish Region) and the provinces of Liège, Namur and Hainaut. Walloon Brabant's capital is Wavre; however, the municipality of Braine-l'Alleud is slightly more populous.

The provincial population was recorded at about 414,000 as of January 2024, and an area of 1,097 square kilometres (424 sq mi).

The Point of Inaccessibility for Belgium (furthest point from any border) lies in Walloon Brabant province at Latitude: 50° 47.2220'N Longitude: 004° 41.29041'E.

== Etymology ==
Walloon is a Belgian version of an old West Germanic word reconstructed as *walh ("foreigner, stranger, speaker of Celtic or Latin"). Brabant is from Old Dutch *brākbant (attested in Medieval Latin as pāgus brācbatensis, Bracbantum, Bracbantia), from Frankish, a compound of Proto-Germanic *brēk-, *brekaną ("fallow, originally 'to break'") + *bant-, *bantō, *banti ("district, region")

Like the terms "Belgium" and "Flanders", the terms "Walloon" and "Brabant" are much older than the modern political entities which they represent today, but were already being used in the region when political boundaries were different. For example, Louis de Haynin wrote as follows in 1628:

The Belgian [region (contrée or province)] is a large country (pays) between France, Germany and the North Sea. This country is typically divided into two regions [régions] which are about equal, which is to say, Belgian Wallonia and Belgian, or according to some, Flemish Germany [belge wallonne et belge allemagne ou flamande, selons aucun]."

De Haynin noted that the distinction people made in his time between Walloon and German or Flemish Belgium was apparently based upon language, with the Walloons speaking French, and the others speaking what he described as a type of Low German (un bas alleman) which people, especially foreigners, referred to as Flemish. Among the provinces within these two large Belgian regions he contrasted "French or Walloon Flanders", now largely within France, with the rest of "Flanders", and "Lothier or Walloon Brabant (brabant wallon)" with the larger "German or Flemish" part of Brabant, which at that time stretched into what is now the Netherlands. Note that for de Haynin and his contemporaries "Belgium" was much larger than modern Belgium, corresponding to the old Burgundian Netherlands and its associated church-ruled principalities. "Belgium" therefore included all of the Netherlands and Luxembourg, and a part of France. In contrast, the term "Flanders" could be used for a smaller region than today, equivalent to the region once dominated by the County of Flanders, near the North Sea. As already noted, de Haynin himself used the adjective "Flemish" to refer to the Dutch language, including dialects outside the old Flemish region, but he noted that the term "Flemish" was now being used to cover a bigger area than it originally applied to, because of the prestige of the old medieval county, which was also well-known to foreigners.

== History ==
The Battle of Waterloo took place in this province in June 1815.

Walloon Brabant was created in 1995 when the former Province of Brabant was split into three parts: two new provinces, Walloon Brabant and Flemish Brabant; and the Brussels Capital Region, which no longer belongs to any province. The split was made to accommodate the federalisation of Belgium in three regions (Flanders, Wallonia and Brussels).

== Subdivisions ==

It has an area of 1,097 square kilometres (424 sq mi) and contains only one administrative district (arrondissement in French), the arrondissement of Nivelles, with 27 municipalities.

Nivelles District:

1. Beauvechain (Bevekom)
2. Braine-l'Alleud (Eigenbrakel)
3. Braine-le-Château (Kasteelbrakel)
4. Chastre
5. Chaumont-Gistoux
6. Court-Saint-Étienne
7. Genappe (Genepiën)
8. Grez-Doiceau (Graven)
9. Hélécine (Heilissem / Heylissem)
10. Incourt
11. Ittre (Itter)
12. Jodoigne (Geldenaken)
13. La Hulpe (Terhulpen)
14. Lasne
15. Mont-Saint-Guibert
16. Nivelles (Nijvel)
17. Orp-Jauche
18. Ottignies-Louvain-la-Neuve
19. Perwez (Perwijs)
20. Ramillies
21. Rebecq
22. Rixensart
23. Tubize (Tubeke)
24. Villers-la-Ville
25. Walhain
26. Waterloo
27. Wavre (Waver)

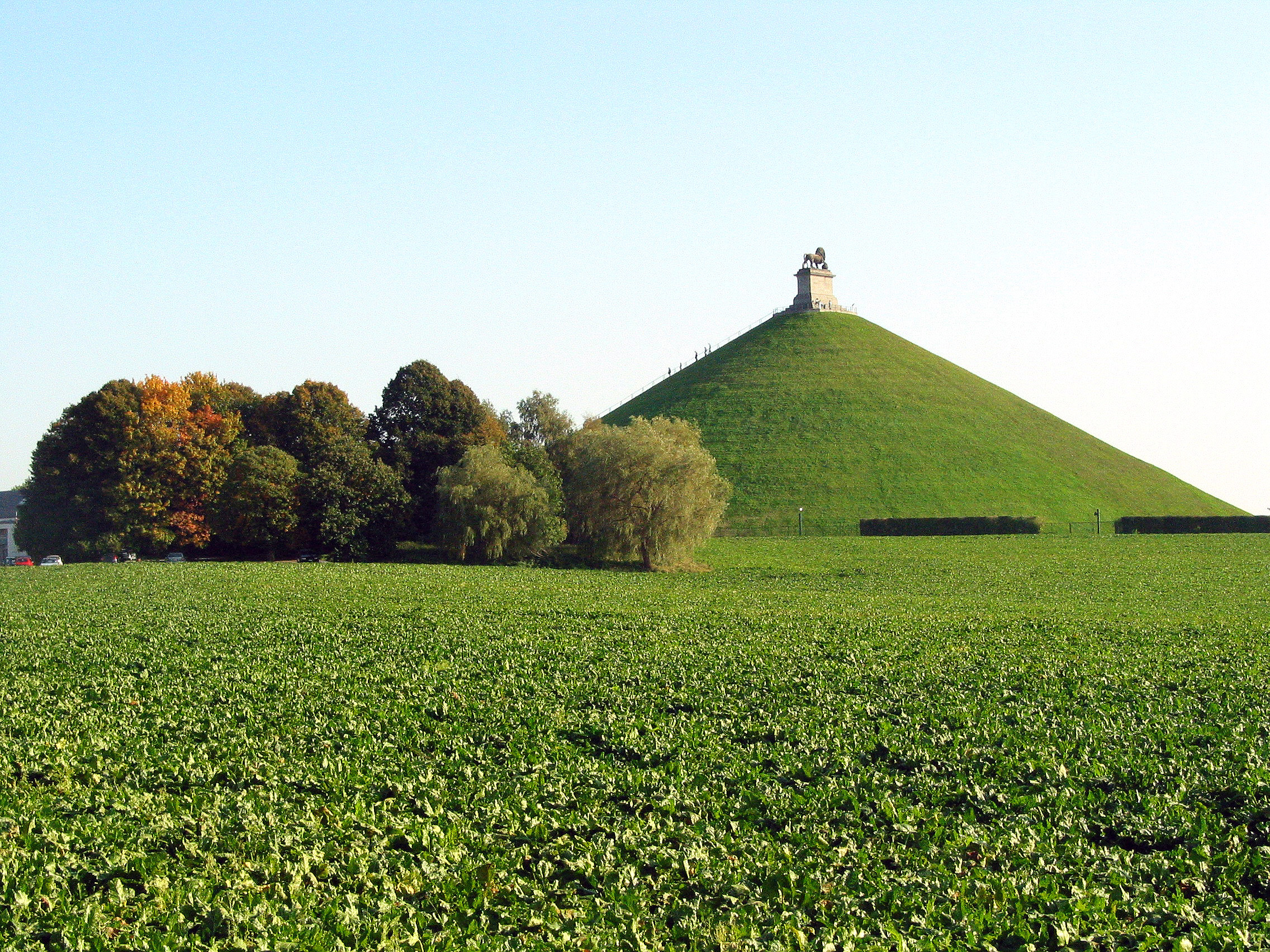
The Butte du Lion in Waterloo

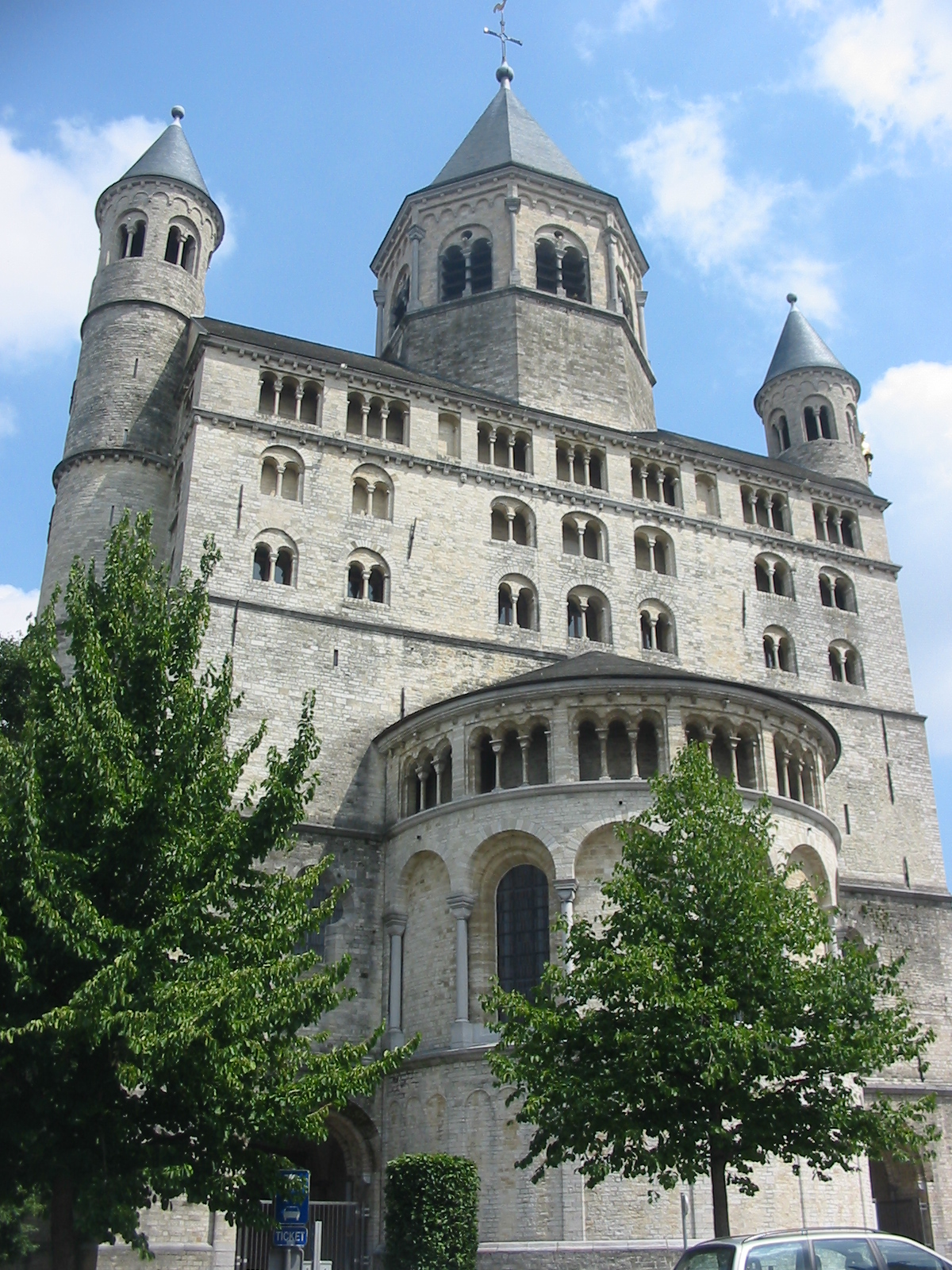
The Collegiate Church of Saint Gertrude in Nivelles

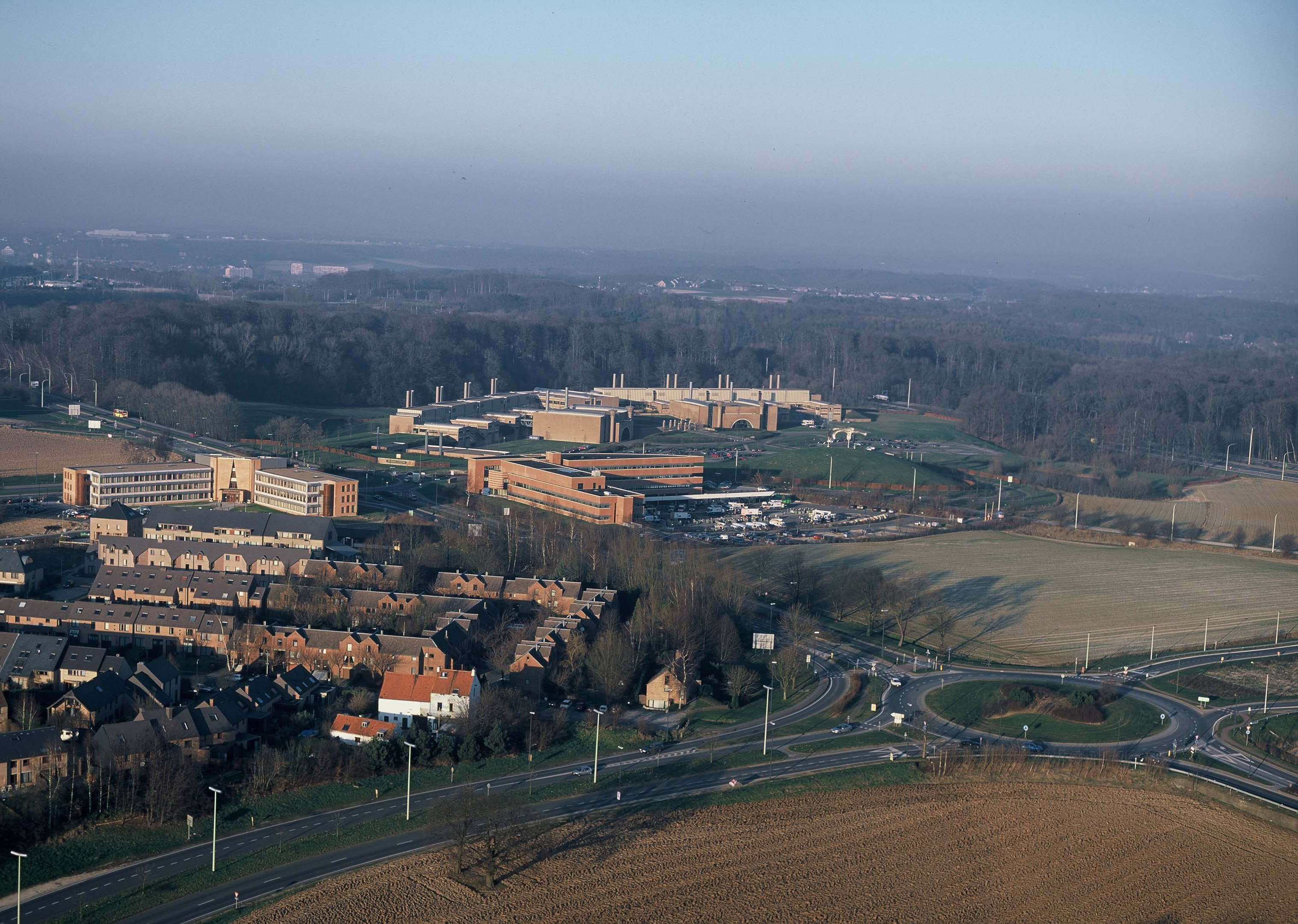
Louvain-la-Neuve Science Park, aerial view

== Economy ==
The regional Gross domestic product (GDP) of the province was 19.3 billion € in 2018, accounting for only 4.2% of Belgium's economic output. GDP per capita adjusted for purchasing power was €42,300 in the same year, equivalent to 140% of the EU27 average. GDP per person employed was still higher, at 157% of the EU27 average. Compared to other Belgian provinces, Walloon Brabant is thus relatively small, but it is the wealthiest. The other four Walloon provinces to Brabant's south all have a significantly lower GDP per capita, none being above €30,000 in 2018. This wealth is at least partly due to the economy of the neighbouring capital city region of Brussels, which is not a province, because many residents of Walloon Brabant are employed there. For comparison, Brussels had a GDP per capita adjusted for purchasing power of €61,300, equivalent to 203% of the EU average, but unlike Walloon Brabant it is significantly lower, at 161%, when calculated per person employed.

Historically the greater Walloon region was one of the earliest regions of industrialization, mainly concentrated in the so-called Sillon industriel, which is to the south of Walloon Brabant. There was also steel production in Clabecq in Walloon Brabant, which is still operating. The Ronquières inclined plane on the Brussels-Charleroi Canal which passes through the province, connects canal traffic between Charleroi, one of the main cities of the Sillon industriel, with Brussels and the Port of Antwerp, to the north of Walloon Brabant.

Today, the University of Louvain (UCLouvain) is located in Walloon Brabant. The Louvain-la-Neuve Science Park is developing cooperation between industry and UCLouvain and is contributing to regional economic development. It covers 231 hectares spread over the area of the town of Ottignies-Louvain-la-Neuve and the municipality of Mont-Saint-Guibert (30 km away from Brussels). The main areas of activity are life sciences, fine chemistry, information technologies and engineering. The park is made up of 135 innovative companies, 4,500 employees, and the university's business incubator.

Piétrain is a breed of domestic pig taking its name from Piétrain, a little village of Jodoigne in Walloon Brabant.

The most important town of this province is Nivelles, which has the Collegiate Church of Saint Gertrude and its westwork.

In Rixensart, the company Recherche et Industrie Thérapeutiques (changed to GlaxoSmithKline Biologicals in 2000) is one of the world's leading vaccine manufacturers, supplying around 25% of the world's vaccines: GSK Biologicals employs a little over 5,300 persons on the Walloon sites of Rixensart, Wavre and Gembloux. The company distributes 36 doses of vaccines every second.

The castle of Corroy-le-Château, one of the best conserved castles of this period in Northern Europe was bought by 21st-century Flemish artist Wim Delvoye for EUR 3.3 million. He is planning to convert the Corroy-le-Château into a museum of modern art.

== Twin towns and sister cities ==
Walloon Brabant is twinned with:

- Shenzhen, China, since 1993
