= Province of Brabant =

Province of Belgium until its splitting in 1995

Coordinates: 50°47′N 4°38′E

- Former province of Belgium (Netherlands until 1830)
- 1815–1995
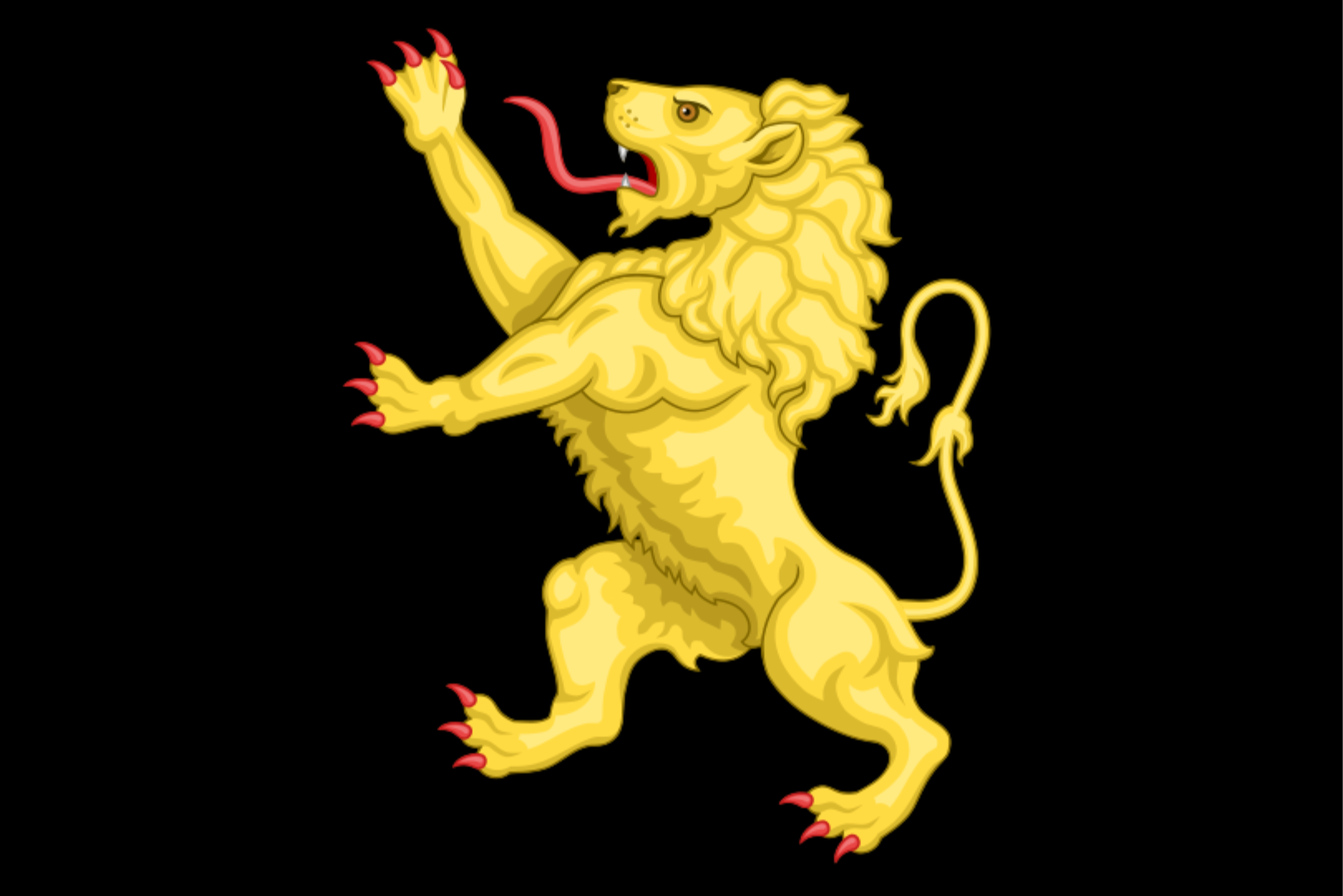
- Flag Coat of arms

- Capital: Brussels
- Demonym: Brabantian
- History
  - Established: 1815
  - Disestablished: 1995
Preceded by
Dyle (department)
Succeeded by
Walloon Brabant
Flemish Brabant
Brussels-Capital Region

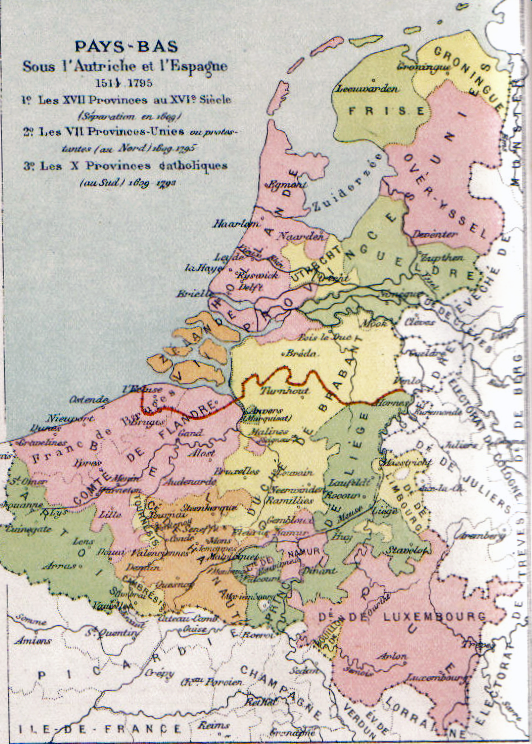
Map of the Low Countries including Brabant (yellow). The border between the Northern and the Southern Netherlands is marked in red

The Province of Brabant (/brəˈbænt/, US also /brəˈbɑːnt, ˈbrɑːbənt/; Dutch: [ˈbraːbɑnt]) was a province in Belgium from 1830 to 1995. It was created in 1815 as South Brabant, part of the United Kingdom of the Netherlands. In 1995, it was split into the Dutch-speaking Flemish Brabant, the French-speaking Walloon Brabant and the bilingual Brussels-Capital Region.

== History ==
=== South Brabant (United Kingdom of the Netherlands) ===
After the defeat of Napoleon in 1815, the United Kingdom of the Netherlands was created at the Congress of Vienna, consisting of territories which had been added to France by Napoleon: the former Dutch Republic and the Southern Netherlands. In the newly created kingdom, the former French département of Dyle became the new province of South Brabant (Dutch: Zuid-Brabant), distinguishing it from Central Brabant (later Antwerp province); and from North Brabant (now part of the Netherlands), all named after the former Duchy of Brabant.

History of the Low Countries (schematic)
Frisii		Germanic tribes		Belgae & Celts			
Frisii	Cana– nefates (Note: Roman foederati)	Chamavi, Tubantes (Note: The Chamavi merged into the confederation of the Franks; the Tubantes merged into the confederation of the Saxons.)		Gallia Belgica (55 BC–c. 5th century AD); Germania Inferior (83–c. 5th century)			
Frisii	Cana– nefates	Salian Franks		Batavi			
unpopulated (4th –c. 5th centuries)		Saxons	Salian Franks (4th–c. 5th centuries)				
Frisian Kingdom (c. 6th century – 734)		Saxons	Frankish Kingdom (481–843)—Carolingian Empire (800–843)				
Frisian Kingdom (c. 6th century – 734)		Austrasia (511–687)					
Middle Francia (843–855)				West; Francia (from 843)	Middle Francia (843–855)		
Kingdom of Lotharingia (Note: Part of East Francia after 939, divided in Upper Lorraine (as part of West Francia) and Lower Lorraine (as part of East Francia) in 959.) (855–959); Duchy of Lower Lorraine (Note: Lower Lorraine—also referred to as Lothier—disintegrated into several smaller independent territories and only the title of a "Duke of Lothier" remained, held by Brabant.) (from 959)			Kingdom of Lotharingia (855–959); Duchy of Lower Lorraine (from 959)	West; Francia (from 843)	Kingdom of Lotharingia (855–959); Duchy of Lower Lorraine (from 959)		
Frisia			Kingdom of Lotharingia (855–959); Duchy of Lower Lorraine (from 959)	County of Flanders (Note: Including County of Artois (part of Flanders until 1237) and Tournaisis.) (862–1384)	Kingdom of Lotharingia (855–959); Duchy of Lower Lorraine (from 959)		
Frisian; Freedom (Note: Lordship of Frisia and Lordship of Groningen (including the Ommelanden) after 1524 and 1536 respectively.) (11th–16th centuries)	County of Holland (Note: Including County of Zeeland, that was ruled by neighboring County of Holland and County of Flanders (until 1432).) (880–1432)	Bishopric of Utrecht (Note: Utrecht included Lordship of Overijssel (until 1528), County of Drenthe (until 1528) and County of Zutphen (until 1182).) (695–1456)	Duchy of Brabant (Note: Duchy of Brabant included since 1288 also the Duchy of Limburg (now part of Belgium's Liège Province) and the "Overmaas" lands Dalhem, Valkenburg and Herzogenrath (now part of the Dutch Province of Limburg).) (1183–1430) Duchy of Guelders (Note: The county, later duchy, of Guelders consisted of four quarters, as they were separated by rivers: situated upstream Upper Quarter (the present day northern half of the Dutch province of Limburg), spatially separated from the three downstream Lower Quarters: County of Zutphen (after 1182), Veluwe Quarter and Nijmegen Quarter. The three lower quarters emerged from the historic gau Hamaland (named after the Chamavi tribe), and formed the present day province of Gelderland. Guelders did not include the Cleves enclave Huissen and the independent counties of Buren and Culemborg, that were much later seceded to the province of Gelderland.) (1046–1543)	County of Flanders (862–1384)	County of Hainaut (1071–1432) County of Namur (981–1421)	Prince- Bishopric of Liège (Note: Throughout the Middle Ages, the bishopric was further expanded with the Duchy of Bouillon in 1096 (ceded to France in 1678), the acquisition of the county of Loon in 1366 and the county of Horne in 1568. The Lordship of Mechelen was also part of the Prince-Bishopric of Liège.)(980–1791)	Duchy of Luxembourg (1059–1443)
Frisian; Freedom (11th–16th centuries)	Burgundian Netherlands (1384–1482)					Prince- Bishopric of Liège (980–1791)	Burgundian Netherlands (1384–1482)
Habsburg Netherlands (1482–1795) (Seventeen Provinces after 1543) (Note: The name Seventeen Provinces came in use after the Habsburg emperor Charles V had re-acquired the Duchy of Guelders, and an continuous territory arose.)						Prince- Bishopric of Liège (980–1791)	Habsburg Netherlands (1482–1795) (Seventeen Provinces after 1543)
Dutch Republic (1581–1795)				Spanish Netherlands (1556–1714)		Prince- Bishopric of Liège (980–1791)	Spanish Netherlands (1556–1714)
Dutch Republic (1581–1795)				Austrian Netherlands (1714–1795)		Prince- Bishopric of Liège (980–1791)	Austrian Netherlands (1714–1795)
Dutch Republic (1581–1795)				United States of Belgium (1790)		Republic of Liège (1789–'91)	United States of Belgium (1790)
Dutch Republic (1581–1795)				Austrian Netherlands (1795–1797)		P.-Bish. of Liège (1791–1794)	Austrian Netherlands (1795–1797)
Batavian Republic (1795–1806); Kingdom of Holland (1806–1810)			associated with French First Republic (1795–1804) part of First French Empire (1804–1815)				
part of First French Empire (1810–1813)			associated with French First Republic (1795–1804) part of First French Empire (1804–1815)				
Sovereign Principality of the Netherlands (1813–1815)			associated with French First Republic (1795–1804) part of First French Empire (1804–1815)				
United Kingdom of the Netherlands (1815–1830)							Grand Duchy of Luxembourg (from 1815)
Kingdom of the Netherlands (from 1839)				Kingdom of Belgium (from 1830)			Grand Duchy of Luxembourg (from 1815)
Kingdom of the Netherlands (from 1839)				Kingdom of Belgium (from 1830)			Grand Duchy of Luxembourg (from 1890)

The provincial governors during this time were:

- 1815–1818: François Joseph Charles Marie de Mercy-Argenteau
- 1818–1823: Philippe d'Arschot Schoonhoven
- 1823–1828: Leonard du Bus de Gisignies
- 1828–1830: Hyacinthe van der Fosse

=== Belgium ===
Diagram of the Belgian Province of Brabant, which was divided into Flemish Brabant (bright yellow), Walloon Brabant (bright red), and the Brussels-Capital Region (orange).

After the Belgian Revolution of 1830, the Southern Netherlands (including South and Central Brabant) became independent as Belgium and later also Luxembourg. The province was then renamed simply Brabant and became the central province of Belgium, with its capital city Brussels. The province contained three arrondissements: Brussels, Leuven and Nivelles.

In 1961–1963, the language border was established, from which the province was divided into a Dutch-speaking region, a French-speaking region and the bilingual Brussels. The Brussels arrondissement was split to this end. In 1989, Brussels-Capital Region was created, but the region was still part of the province of Brabant.

In 1995, the province of Brabant was split into the Dutch-speaking Flemish Brabant, the French-speaking Walloon Brabant and the bilingual Brussels-Capital Region. The Brussels-Capital Region exercises the powers of a Province on its own territory.

== Demographics ==
As comparison, the current two provinces of Brabant, together with Brussels, had 2,621,275 inhabitants in January 2011.

Number of inhabitants x 1000

== See also ==
- State reform in Belgium
- Duchy of Brabant
