= Izegem =

- City and municipality
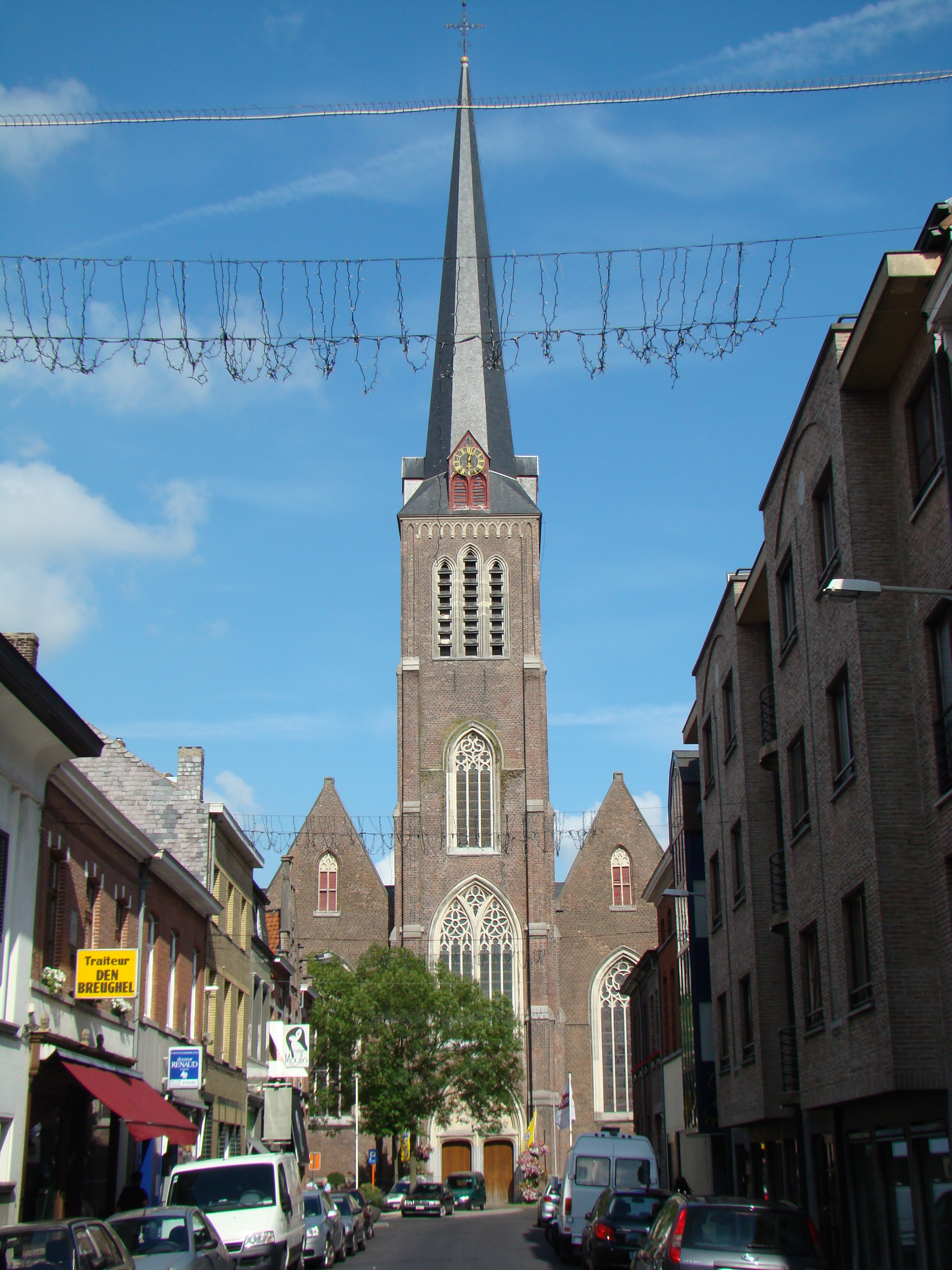

- Flag Coat of arms

- Location of Izegem in West Flanders
- Interactive map of Izegem
- Location in Belgium
- Coordinates: 50°55′N 03°12′E
- Country: Belgium
- Community: Flemish Community
- Region: Flemish Region
- Province: West Flanders
- Arrondissement: Roeselare

Government
  - Mayor: Kurt Gymonprez (STIP)
  - Governing parties: STIP, Vlaams Belang

Area
  - Total: 25.63 km^{2} (9.90 sq mi)

Population (2022-01-01)
  - Total: 28,845
  - Density: 1,125/km^{2} (2,915/sq mi)
- Postal codes: 8870
- NIS code: 36008
- Area codes: 051
- Website: www.izegem.be

Izegem (Dutch pronunciation: [ˈizəɣɛm]; West Flemish: Yzegem) is a city and municipality located in the Belgian province of West Flanders. The municipality comprises the city of Izegem proper and the towns of Emelgem and Kachtem. Emelgem was added to Izegem in 1965, Kachtem in 1977. Izegem itself lies on the southern banks of the Mandel, Emelgem and Kachtem on the north. Along the shores of the canal a large industrial zone has developed, which made the three municipalities one urban area. On January 1, 2006, Izegem had a total population of 26,544. The total area is 25.48 km^{2} (9.84 sq mi) which gives a population density of 1,042 inhabitants per km².

Izegem is also known as the pekkerstad, borstelstad or schoenenstad. The river Mandel and the canal Roeselare–Leie run throughout the city. Izegem used to be famous for its shoe- and brush-making. Today there are only a few factories left, but the city houses a shoe- and brush museum. Until the 1920s, Izegem was often spelled Iseghem, which can be found on old passport applications, birth records, and gazetteers. The Van Iseghem surname originally referred to this city.

#	Name	Area (km^{2})	Population
I	Izegem	14,88
II	Kachtem	5,17
III	Emelgem	5,44

Izegem shares borders with the following villages and towns:

- a. Ingelmunster (town Ingelmunster)
- b. Lendelede (town Lendelede)
- c. Sint-Eloois-Winkel (town Ledegem)
- d. Rumbeke (city Roeselare)
- e. Roeselare (city Roeselare)
- f. Ardooie (town Ardooie)
- g. Meulebeke (town Meulebeke)

== Notable people ==
- Ancestral town of famed British actor Dirk Bogarde through paternal grandfather Aimé Van Den Bogaerde.
- Johan Bruyneel, former professional cyclist and director of Team RadioShack who led Lance Armstrong during the Tour de France was born here.
- The band members of 't Hof van Commerce, including singer–songwriter Flip Kowlier, are from Izegem.
- Bart Staes, member of the European Parliament, was born in Izegem.
- Yves Lampaert, professional cyclist, was born here in 1991.
- Ulla Werbrouck, judoka, Olympic gold winner at the 1996 Atlanta Games.
- Martijn Wydaeghe, rally co-driver competing alongside Thierry Neuville at the World Rally Championship.
