= Ingelmunster =

- Municipality
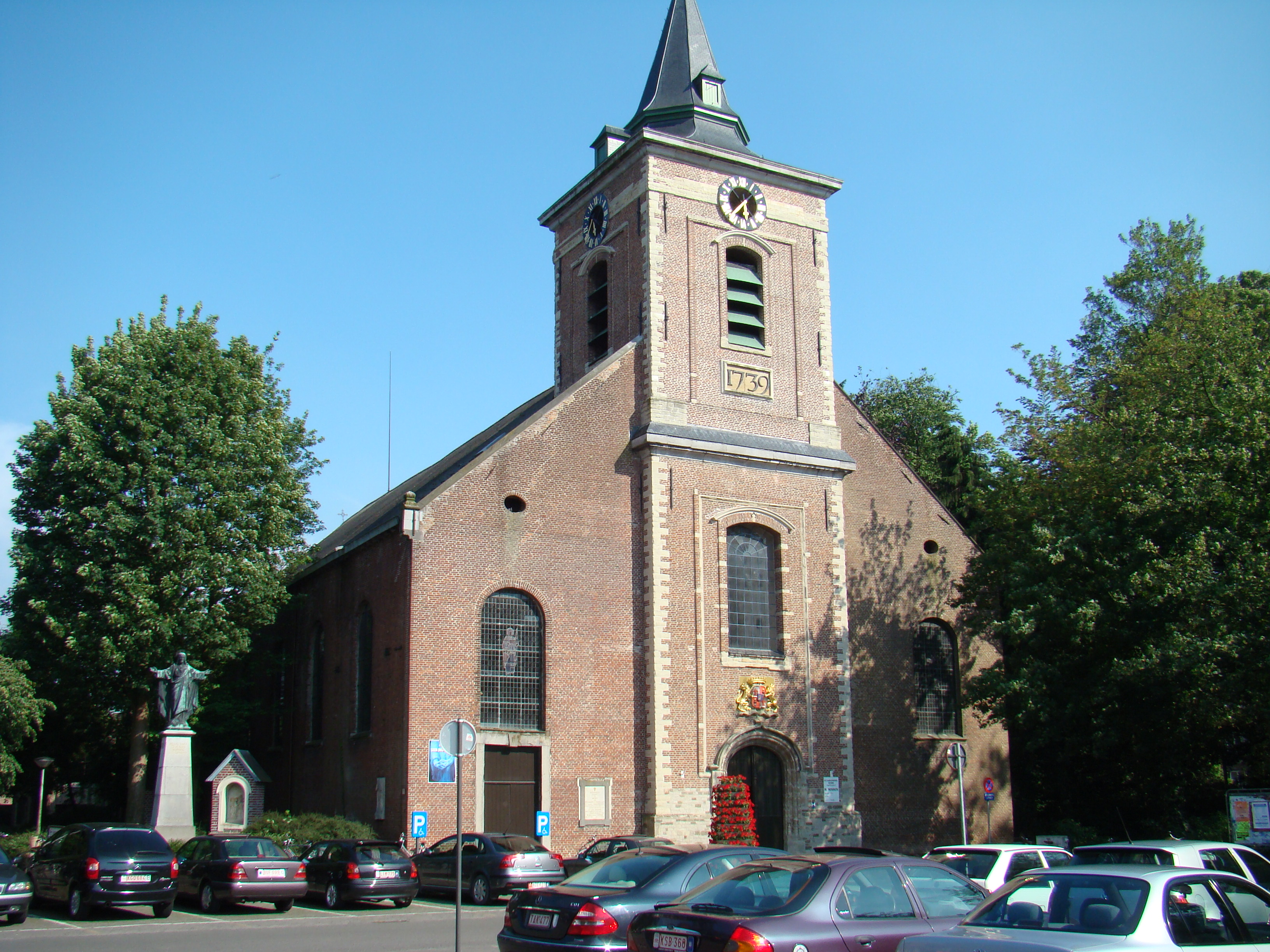
- St-Amandus church besides the castle of Ingelmunster

- Flag Coat of arms

- Location of Ingelmunster in West Flanders
- Interactive map of Ingelmunster
- Location in Belgium
- Coordinates: 50°55′N 03°15′E
- Country: Belgium
- Community: Flemish Community
- Region: Flemish Region
- Province: West Flanders
- Arrondissement: Roeselare

Government
  - Mayor: Kurt Windels (De Brug)
  - Governing party: De Brug/N-VA/Open VLD

Area
  - Total: 16.43 km^{2} (6.34 sq mi)

Population (2018-01-01)
  - Total: 10,928
  - Density: 665.1/km^{2} (1,723/sq mi)
- Postal codes: 8770
- NIS code: 36007
- Area codes: 051
- Website: www.ingelmunster.be

Ingelmunster (Dutch pronunciation: [ˌɪŋəlˈmʏnstər]; West Flemish: Iengelmunstr) is a municipality located in the Belgian province of West Flanders. The municipality comprises only the town of Ingelmunster proper and the village of Kriek. As of January 1, 2006, Ingelmunster had a total population of 10,617. Its total area is 16.16 km². Thus, its population density is 657 inhabitants per km².

== History ==
=== The Middle Ages ===
The famous Flemish historian Sanderus mentioned Ingelmunster as "Anglo-Monasterium" ("English monastery"), but the name could also have originated from the term "Angle-Monastère" ("monastery on the corner"), as it was situated in the outskirts of the fiefdom.

It is said that Saint Amand ordered the locals to have a church built in the village, going so far as to plan a monastery. Additionally, Robrecht the Frisian thought of the village as a strategic point and considered it important enough to have a fortification built. The parish was transferred to the chapter of Harelbeke around 1200. In 1300, the castle and the fiefdom fell into the possession of the lords of Rode, from the region of Dendermonde.

In the Middle Ages, Ingelmunster was, partly owing to its fortification, an important location in the Castellany of Kortrijk and the canton of Harelbeke. The village fiefdom came under the rule of the lords of Gistel after the House of Rode. It then became part of Burgundy and Cleves, and ultimately subject to the French throne.

The most famous royal resident of the village was Philip the Fair, King of France, who resided in the castle in 1297, five years before the Battle of the Golden Spurs. At that time, Philip was on his way to punish Bruges. The people of Bruges met him halfway with an offer of submission to his rule, on the condition that they be allowed to keep the relic of the Holy Blood. The French king accepted.

=== Religious conflict ===
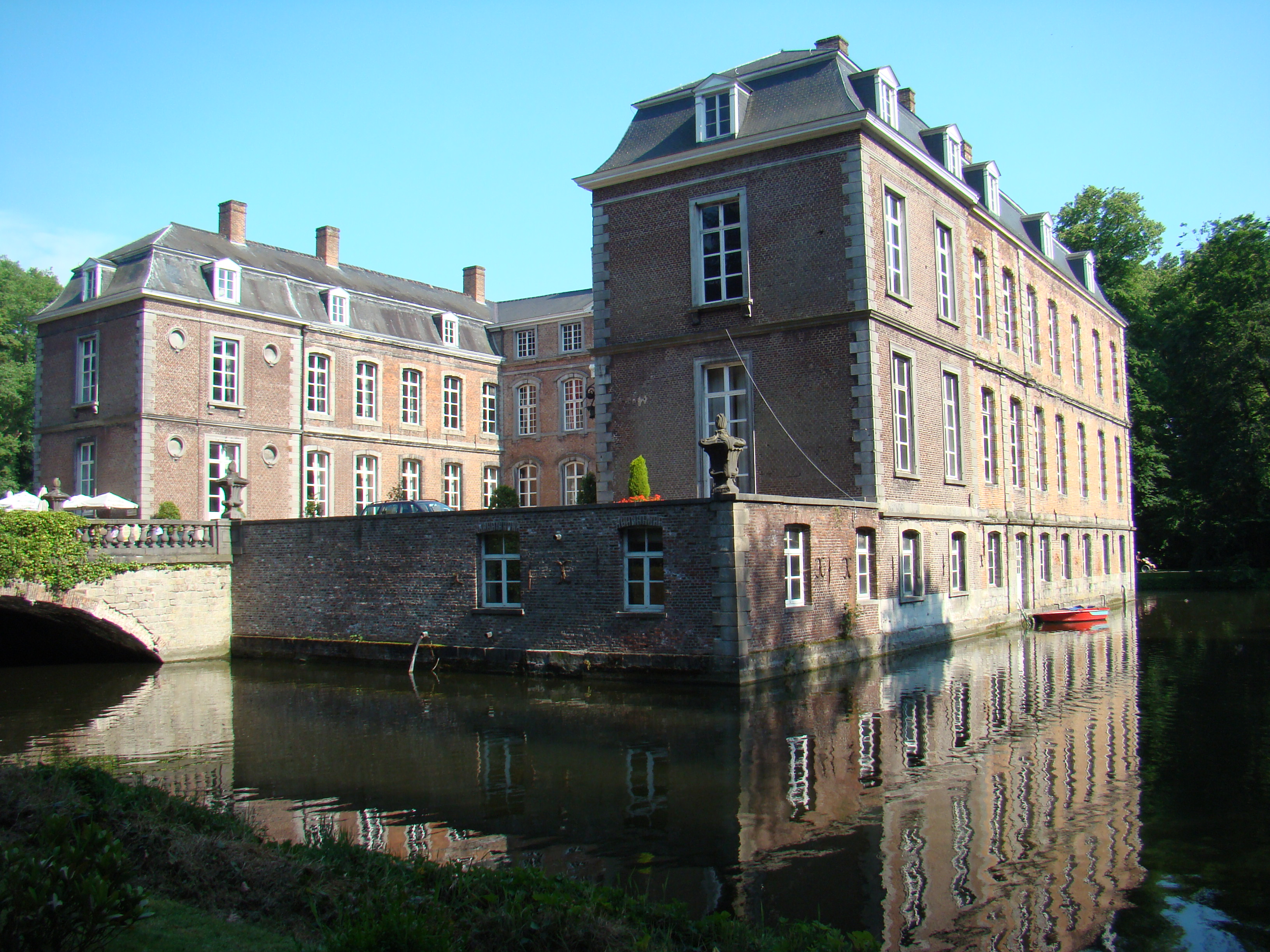
The castle of Ingelmunster

During the religious wars of the 16th century, Ingelmunster became the victim of both warring parties. In August 1566, the Beeldenstormers passed by the village and pillaged and destroyed the church. The church was rebuilt with a tower in its center. In 1739, that tower would be torn down and a new one rebuilt in front of the church. The new tower remains standing to this day.

During the Eighty Years' War, in 1580 the battle of Ingelmunster was fought. Troops of the Union of Utrecht led by François de la Noue were defeated by pro-Spanish Malcontents. The village was destroyed, but de la Noue was arrested and sent to the Spanish Commander-in-Chief Alessandro Farnese, Duke of Parma and Piacenza. In 1878, a large tapestry was woven in the local factories in commemoration of "The Battle of Ingelmunster, 1580." This tapestry currently hangs on the wall of the Town Hall.

The extensive fighting in France and the Southern Netherlands exhausted the French crown's money. Paris was barely able to pay its German colonels. The fiefdom of Ingelmunster-Vijve-Dendermonde was given as pay to the colonels. Otto von Plotho, a German colonel serving in the French army, purchased the fiefdom in 1583. In doing so, he satisfied the needs of his superiors and also accumulated significant wealth for himself.

Otto von Plotho assigned to his bailiff, François de Cabootere, the mission to organize his Flemish regions and to create legislative order. Ingelmunster became the center of the region and the administration there had absolute power. Even the executions in the region were carried out in Ingelmunster. In 1789, the last execution was carried out and the body was put on display in the field behind the café called "'t Leestje".

Fifteen generations of lords owned the fiefdom and ruled it, with variable luck. However, after 400 years, the wealth was exhausted and the last remnants of the old fiefdom, the park and castle, were sold in 1986 to the two brothers Vanhonsebrouck.

The 17th century was a troublesome time for the region. Many skirmishes and conflicts between the English, French, and Spanish soldiers made life in the village of Ingelmunster trying. In 1695, the castle and the village were again completely razed. Only 1050 inhabitants survived to the turn of the century. In that time, France had extended its control to the village border with Emelgem.

=== Habsburg rule ===
The Treaty of Utrecht in 1713 ameliorated the strife. The Southern Netherlands were transferred to Austrian rule. Between 1716 and 1794, five governors-general directed the local government. Proof of Ingelmunster's revival was the reconstruction of the castle. The old fortification was demolished and a residential castle was built on its foundations around 1736.

Under the rule of Maria Theresa of Austria, the Kortrijk-Bruges road was rebuilt. In Ingelmunster, the bridge over the River Mandel was renewed and the toll rights were sold in 1751. A private company maintained the connection between Kortrijk and Bruges and operated a post in Ingelmunster.

Pastor Jacobus Dufort felt that something had to be done about the education of the local children. Paying from his own pocket, he constructed the Dufort Institute (later called "Marullenschool"), a school for the poor employing seven nuns. From this school, the local monastery was founded in 1881. This monastery is still a part of Ingelmunster.

=== The French Revolution ===
The French Revolution in 1789 marked a major turning point in European history. Even the enlightened Austrians were startled, and not even Ingelmunster escaped the radical changes to society. The castle lost a significant amount of power and was forced to pay taxes. The local authorities were reformed and a municipal council with a mayor was created for the 4705 "citoyens." The rebellion against the regime led to an uprising, the Boerenkrijg, but subsequent to the Brigandszondag on October 28, 1798, all resistance was gone. Ingelmunster acquired its nickname "Brigandsgemeente" from this historical event.

The rural village continued to exist and changes were made, but life returned to normal for the villagers. The locals were happy they could celebrate Mass on Sunday again. Indeed, when Napoleon was defeated at the Battle of Waterloo in 1815, there were no festivities in Ingelmunster.

=== The 19th century ===
William I of the Netherlands granted Ingelmunster a market day in 1825 in order to allow the villagers access to supplies without having to leave their town, and this initiative was lauded by the Orangists. Around 1830, dozens of windmills were erected throughout in the municipality.

The Belgian Revolution in 1830 first reached Ingelmunster on November 11, when a new council was to be elected. Of the 5585 inhabitants, only 114 upper-class citizens had suffrage. The Orangists lost and a local farmer, Jacobus Coussens, was elected the new mayor with 66 votes. At this time, the Catholics formed a political party. It was immediately popular and thenceforth no other political party has controlled the council or mayorship.

Between the years of 1845 and 1850, potato harvests failed. Meanwhile, the Industrial Revolution was devastating local weaving businesses. Additionally, the region was impacted by widespread cholera and typhus.

In 1847, the village saw some development with the laying of a railroad through the village. In the future, this improved access to transportation would reap both bounties and consequences for Ingelmunster. For example, during World War I, the castle was commandeered by the Germans as a headquarters, and during the war, thieves frequently robbed local businesses.

A second city planning project met with less success the construction of the railroad. Plans to connect the city of Roeselare to the river Leie met with resistance in Ingelmunster due to the presence of the castle park. However, in 1872 the first ship sailed to the Leie and a quay was built near the village bridge.

=== The 20th Century ===
Ingelmunster has been spared from heavy industry and strong pollution up until the present day and still possesses a castle park and nature reserve in the center of the village.

In 1976, the town was preserved from fusions with the neighboring towns of Meulebeke and Oostrozebeke. The mayor at the time, Vankeirsbilck, succeeded in safeguarding Meulebeke and Oostrozebeke from fusion as well.
