= Roeselare–Leie Canal =

Canal in Belgium

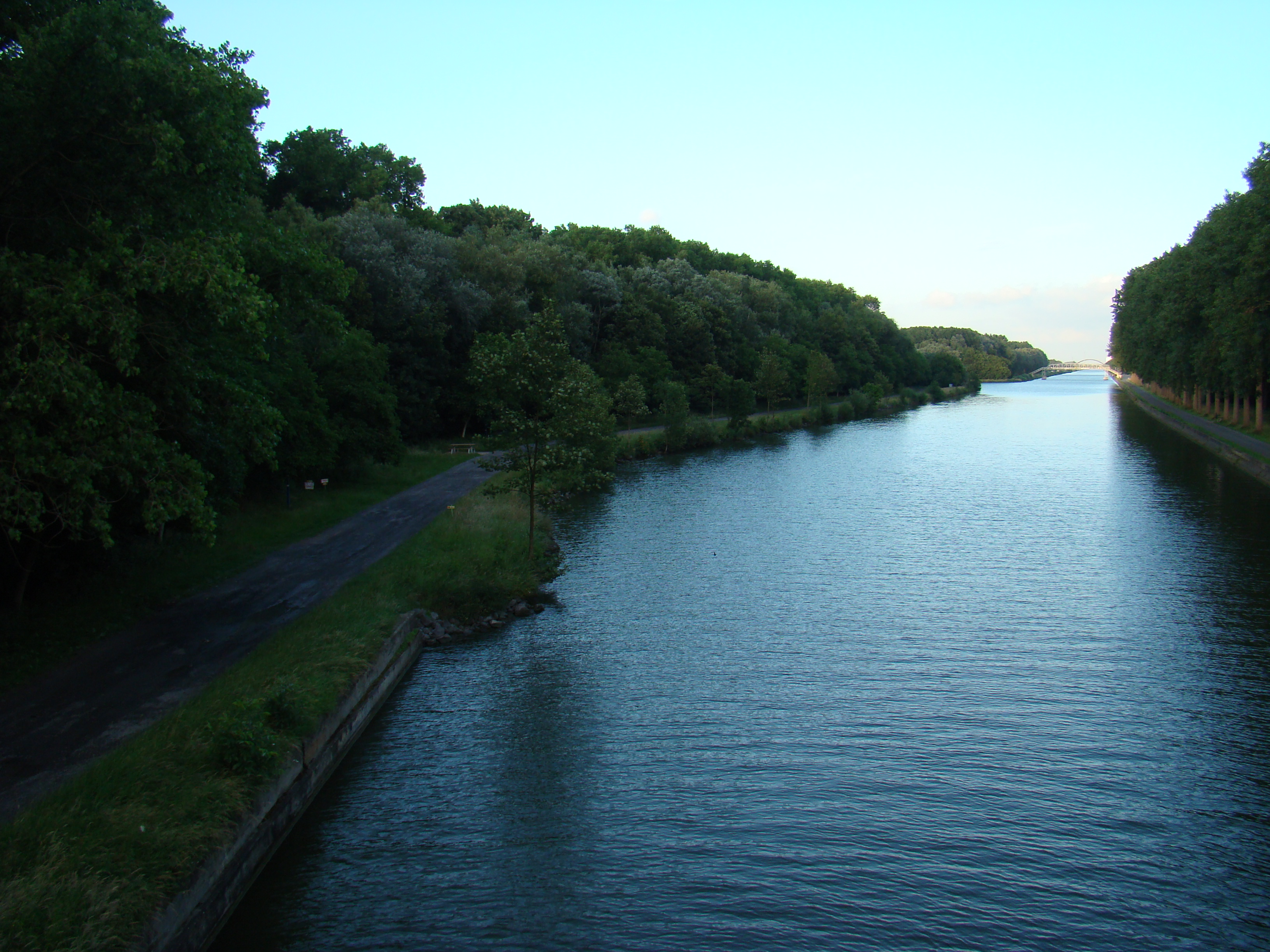
- The canal in Ingelmunster, with a view on the nature reserve Mandelhoek (left)
- Country: Belgium

Specifications
- Length: 16.5 km (10.3 miles)

Geography
- Direction: West
- Start point: Leie River
- End point: Roeselare

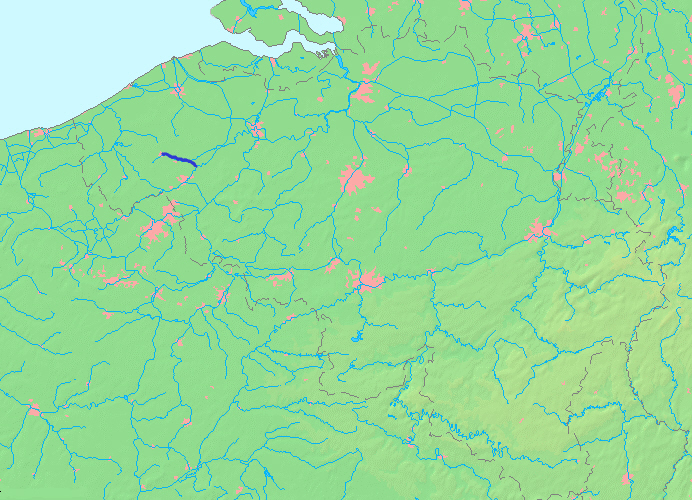
Location of the Roeselare–Leie Canal

The Roeselare–Leie Canal is an artificial waterway between the town Roeselare and the river Leie in West Flanders, Belgium. The canal is 16.5 kilometres long and was dug in 10 years between 1862 and 1872. The employment grew and ships with a carrying capacity of 600 tonnes brought grain, sand and other basic products to the factories around the canal.

== Port of Roeselare ==
The port of Roeselare, at the start of the Roeselare–Leie Canal, is mainly characterized by a thriving industrial activity. Well-known companies that are located there include Hendrix and Debaillie, both producers of animal food. Soubry, the well-known dough manufacturer, also has an establishment there.

The Roeselare port covers an area of 40 hectares and is easily accessible by road. Nearby is the A17/E403 highway Bruges-Kortrijk with many opportunities to explore the coast, the inland or the Belgian-French and Belgian-Dutch border regions. The disclosure in Roeselare is also good with the Mandel Avenue that can be used to access the industrial zone in Beveren. It is also easy to choose driving through the King Albert I Avenue until the inner ring road to the outer ring road N36/R32. The canal connects Roeselare with the ports of Dunkirk, Ghent, Antwerp, Brussels and Liege, via the Leie.

== Municipalities ==
Following the canal from Roeselare City, one passes first the town of Izegem where the food company Vandemoortele Groep is located, then Ingelmunster and Oostrozebeke, and finally Ooigem, a municipality of Wielsbeke where the canal joins the Leie. There is a lock to overcome a height of 7.50 meters. The Kortrijk-Bruges railway line runs a few kilometers parallel to the canal that can handle barges up to 1350 tonnes. There is a proposal to build a container terminal for temporary container storage alongside the canal.

The Leiestreek tourist office and the municipality are working on a project to give the canal and the green area around it a recreational function. For example, during the summer there are already boat cruises. The banks of the canal are also frequented by fishermen.

The piece of the canal between Roeselare port and the town is an ideal backdrop for street theater and cultural events, such as the happening "De Groote Stooringe".

== Zwaaikom ==
The ‘Zwaaikom’ in Roeselare is a turn in the canal. This widening makes that big ships can turn quite easy to leave the port. Nowadays there is a lot of industry in that neighbourhood and almost no inhabitation (if you compare it with the port of Roeselare proper). The big roundabout is very important for easy freight-traffic on the road. At this roundabout, there is a building for recreation near by the water-side where you can rent a kayak.
