= Coyecques =

- Commune
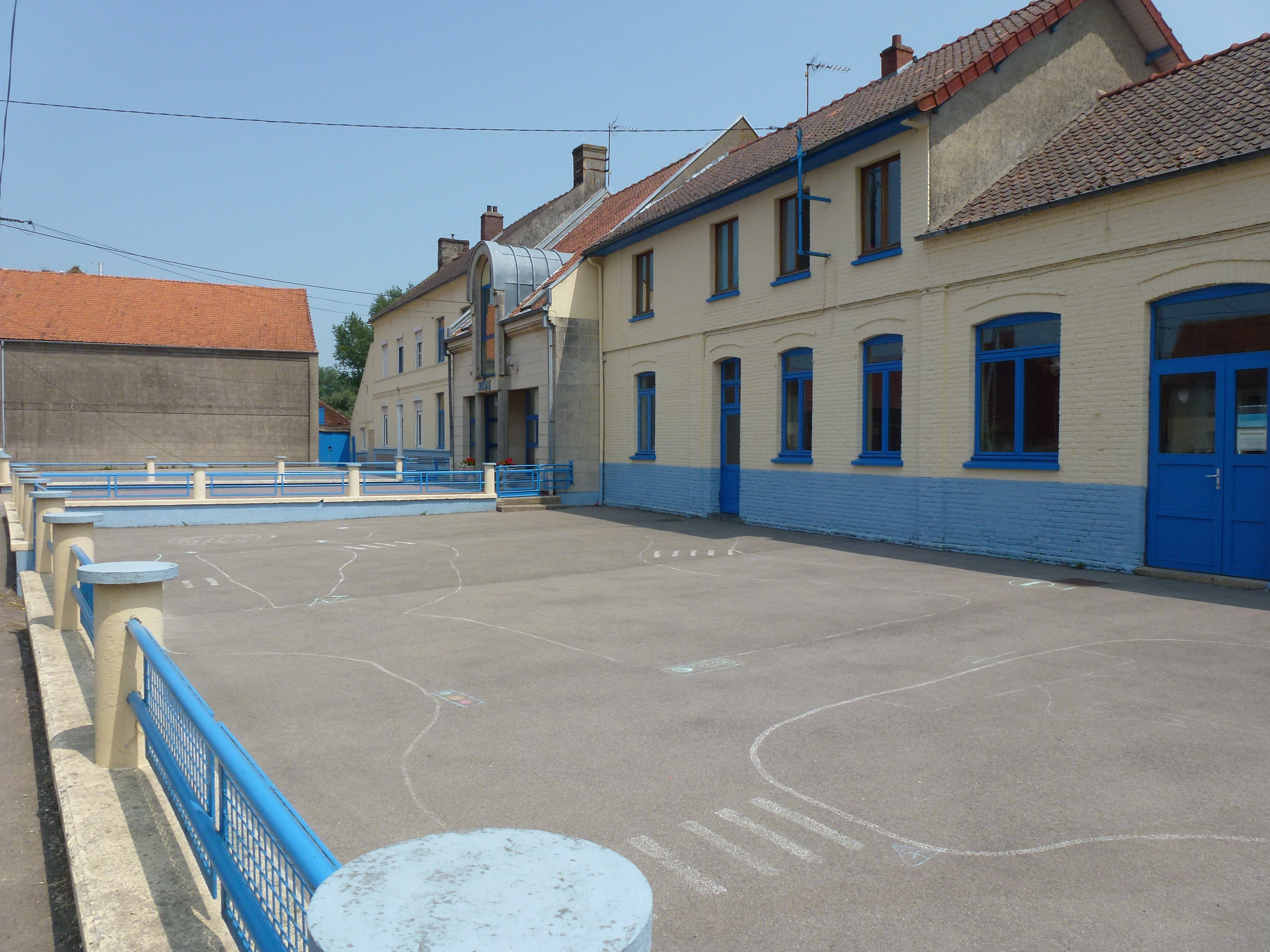
- The town hall and school of Coyecques

- Coat of arms
- Location of Coyecques
- Location within France Location within Hauts-de-France
- Coordinates: 50°36′15″N 2°11′00″E
- Country: France
- Region: Hauts-de-France
- Department: Pas-de-Calais
- Arrondissement: Saint-Omer
- Canton: Fruges
- Intercommunality: Pays de Saint-Omer

Government
  - Mayor (2020–2026): Pascal Delforge
- Area^{1}: 13.89 km^{2} (5.36 sq mi)
- Elevation: 48 m (157 ft)
- Highest elevation: 173 m (568 ft)
- Lowest elevation: 43 m (141 ft)
- Population (2023): 597
  - Density: 43.0/km^{2} (111/sq mi)
- Time zone: UTC+01:00 (CET)
  - Summer (DST): UTC+02:00 (CEST)
- INSEE/Postal code: 62254 /62560
- ^{1} French Land Register data, which excludes lakes, ponds, glaciers > 1 km^{2} (0.386 sq mi or 247 acres) and river estuaries.

Coyecques (French pronunciation: [kɔjɛk]; Picard: Coyécque) is a commune in the Pas-de-Calais department in the Hauts-de-France region of France 10 miles (16 km) south of Saint-Omer, by the banks of the river Lys.

== Population ==
Historical population
Year	Pop.	±% p.a.
1968	568	—
1975	540	−0.72%
1982	544	+0.11%
1990	551	+0.16%
1999	562	+0.22%
2007	581	+0.42%
2012	580	−0.03%
2017	606	+0.88%
2023	597	−0.25%
Source: INSEE

== See also ==
- Communes of the Pas-de-Calais department
