= Emelgem =

- Deelgemeente
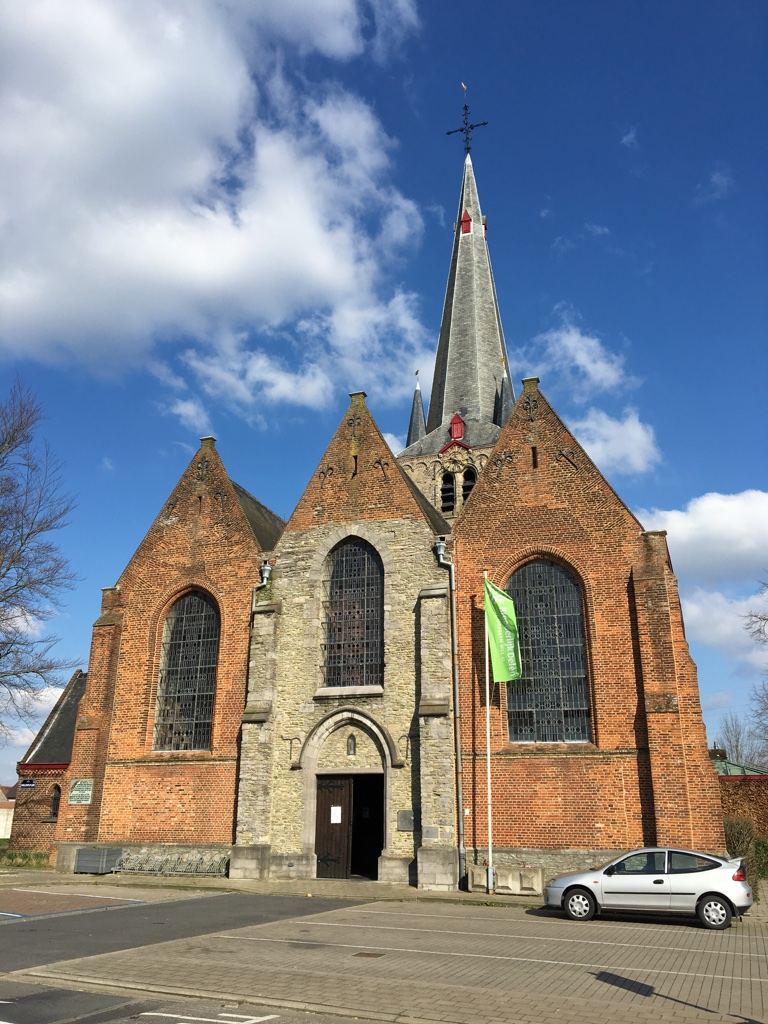

- Location within Belgium
- Coordinates: 50°55′24″N 3°13′47″E
- Country: Belgium
- Province: West Flanders
- Municipality: Izegem

Area
  - Total: 5.44 km^{2} (2.10 sq mi)
- Source: NIS
- Postal code: 8870

Emelgem is a village in the Belgian province of West Flanders and a part (deelgemeente) of the municipality Izegem. Emelgem was an independent municipality until 1964. On that moment Emelgem had an area from 5,44 km^{2} and was counting 5049 inhabitants.

Emelgem is located close to the river the Mandel and to the canal Roeselare-Leie.

== History ==
Even in antiquity Emelgem was inhabited, witness hereby are the prehistoric findings such as buildings and fire stones. Further, there also were Roman and Frankish findings.

Emelgem was long an agricultural village. Many inhabitants worked in the shoe and brush industry in the nearby city of Izegem. After the Second World War the village developed into a residential town and grew slowly with Izegem. On 1 January 1965 Emelgem was added administratively to Izegem.

== Sightseeing ==
- The protected Sint-Pieters church from the 18th century.

== Evolution from the inhabitants numbers ==
=== 19th century ===
| Year | 1806 | 1816 | 1830 | 1846 | 1856 | 1866 | 1876 | 1880 | 1890 |
|---|---|---|---|---|---|---|---|---|---|
| inhabitants numbers | 1591 | 1689 | 1806 | 1932 | 1647 | 1776 | 1924 | 1853 | 2073 |
Note:results from the people counts on 31/12

=== 20th century until the fusion with Izegem ===
| Year | 1900 | 1910 | 1920 | 1930 | 1947 | 1961 |
|---|---|---|---|---|---|---|
| Inhabitants numbers | 2460 | 3131 | 3124 | 3390 | 4129 | 4729 |
Note:results from the people counts on 31/12 until 1970 + 31 December 1976
