= Mandel (river) =

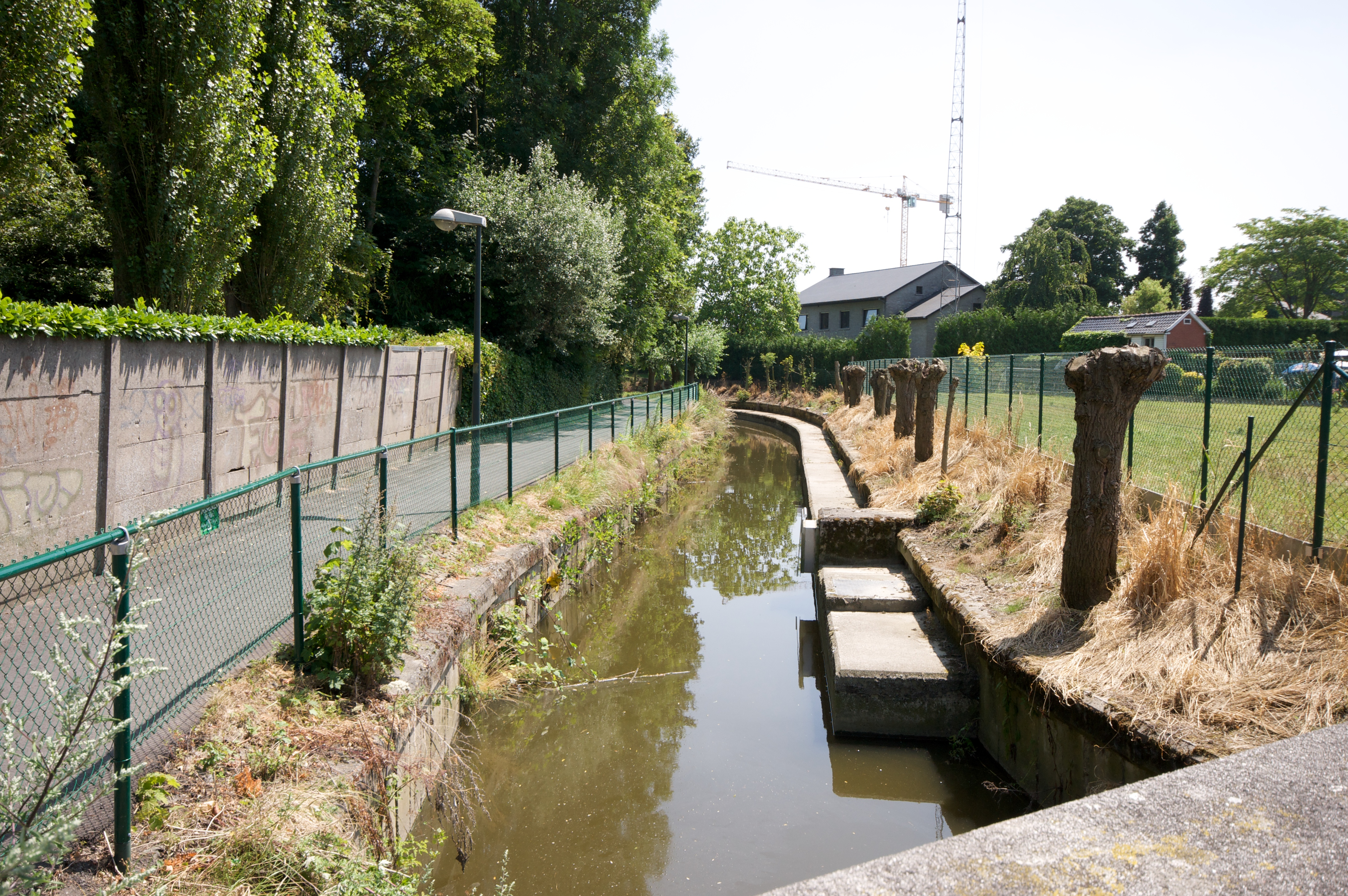
- Mandel in Roeselare

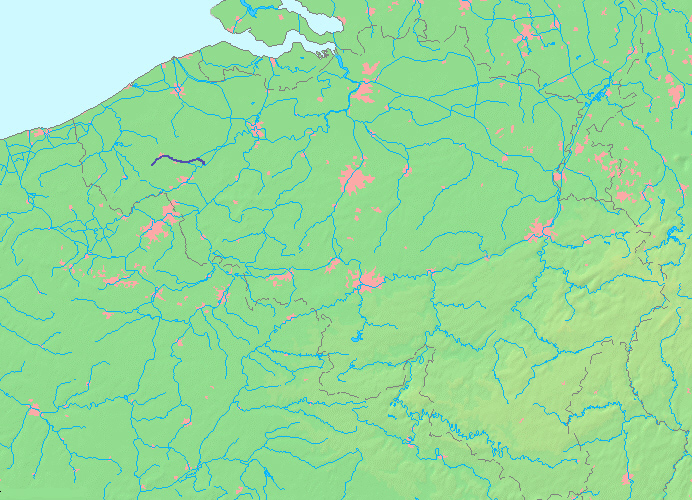

Location
- Country: Belgium

Physical characteristics
- Source
  - location: Passendale
- Mouth
  - location: Leie River, near Waregem
  - coordinates: 50°55′02″N 3°25′17″E
- Length: 40 km (25 mi)

Basin features
- Progression: Leie→ Scheldt→ North Sea

The Mandel is a 40-kilometre (25 mi) long river in the Belgian province of West Flanders, left tributary of the Leie (Lys). Its source is located in Passendale. It flows through Roeselare and Ingelmunster, and into the Leie near Waregem.
