= Transport Office of the Devastated Territories of West Flanders =

Defunct Belgian government agency

Coordinates: 50.946322°N 3.134180°E

Transport Office of the Devastated Areas in West Flanders
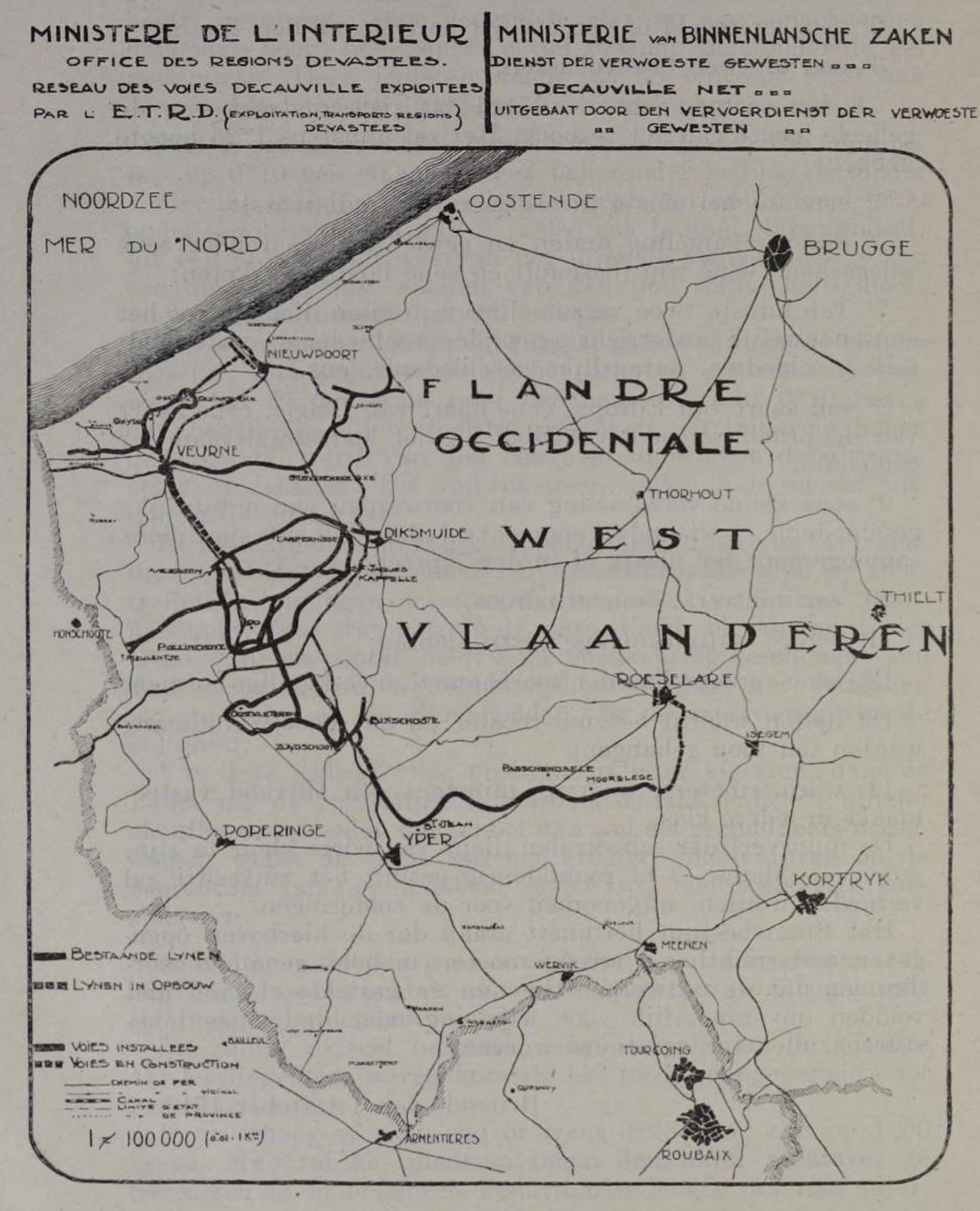
- Light railway network in the Devastated Territories of West Flanders, December 1919

Overview
- Native name: Exploitation des Transports des Régions Dévastées, ETRD

Technical
- Line length: 700 km (430 mi)
- Track gauge: 600 mm (1 ft 11 5/8 in)

The Belgian Transport Office of the Devastated Territories of West Flanders (Flemish: Vervoerdienst der Verwoeste Gewesten, French: Exploitation des Transports des Régions Dévastées, ETRD) operated 260 road transport vehicles and a 700 km (430 mi) long light railway network with a track gauge of 600 mm (1 ft 11 5/8 in) during the post-war period of World War I in West Flanders.

== History ==
During the reconstruction of the areas in West Flanders that were destroyed during the First World War, the transport of building materials was not an easy task, as the destroyed infrastructure caused many problems. To solve this, the State Service of the Devastated Territories (Flemish: Dienst der Verwoeste Gewesten, DVG) set up the Transport Office of the Devastated Territories in West Flanders, called Exploitation des Transports des Régions Dévastées, ETRD in French.

In the autumn of 1919, the Transport Office took over the light railway network built by English and Belgian forces from the War Ministry. It had its headquarters in Roeselare and branches in Vlamertinge, Veurne, Sint-Idesbald and Menen. It operated from 9 April 1919 to 19 August 1926 and was successively subordinate to the Ministry of the Interior, the Ministry of State Administration (later the Ministry of Economic Affairs) and the Ministry of Agriculture. (Note: As the available vehicles were used intensively by several services, only a few could be used for the transport of building materials on the Decauville railways, which were available in large numbers in the region. Applications had to be made by the end of December 1919 to Colonel Deridder, who had his office in the High Commission at Langstraat 17 in Bruges, and to the attached Royal High Commissioners.)

The Transport Office lent vehicles and equipment to organisations and private individuals. It provided Decauville material to brickmakers from January 1920 onwards when they contacted the Transport Board (ETRD) at Spanjestraat 56 in Roeselaere in this regard. At the height of its activity it owned 87 steam and 69 motor locomotives, 1974 light railway wagons and a 700 km network of light railways, narrow gauge railways and Decauville railways.

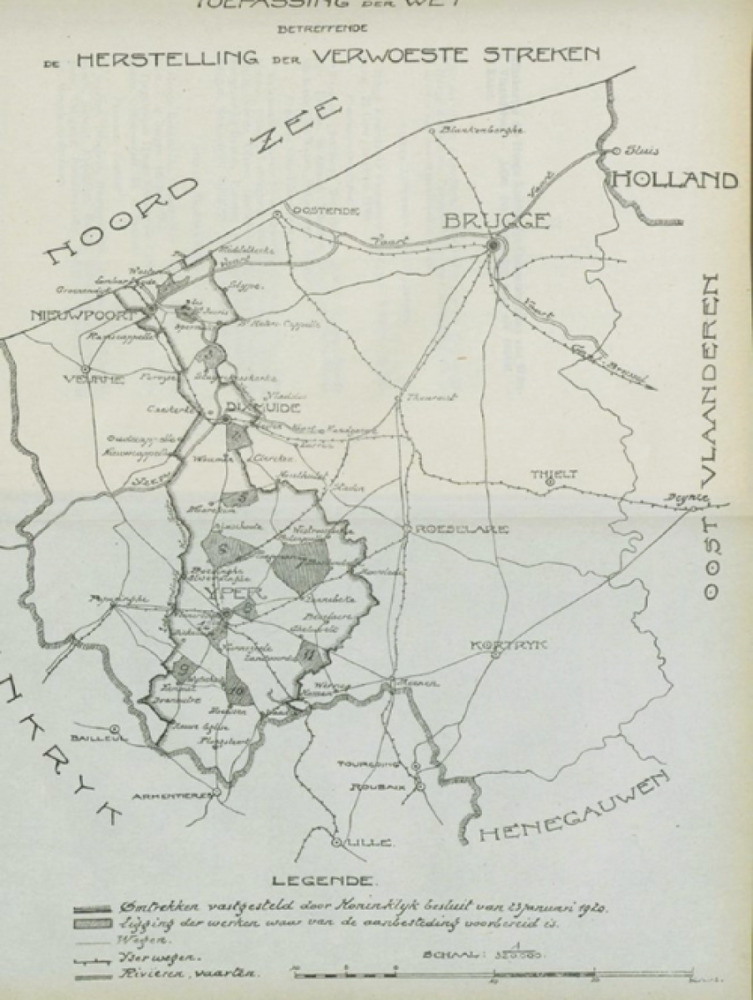
Map of the Devastated Territories of West Flanders, 23 Jan 1920 (Note: The map of 23 January 1920 shows the demarcation of the severely affected "devastated areas" and the most destroyed areas (in dark grey) that the state wanted to expropriate with a view to their restoration. The Agricultural Restoration Act (15 November 1919) only applied within the demarcated areas (verwoeste gewesten). This area between the North Sea coast and the Belgian-French border at Komen lay entirely within the former frontline zone and covered about 55,000 ha, i.e. the agricultural areas most affected during World War I.)

In the autumn of 1919, the Transport Department already had 260 trucks and tractors for road transport. Despite these efforts, the destroyed infrastructure and the huge volume of transport led to challenges, including the need to deliver six billion bricks between 1 January 1920 and 30 June 1922. In a letter dated 25 May 1922, the Transport Service requested the delivery of a further six billion bricks. May 1922, the Transport Service requested the construction company Batteauw, Van Overmeire & Devos of Oudenaarde to lay the Decauville railway, which it leased, on a new route, as the British Military Cemetery Service wanted to make the Bedford House military cemetery permanent, and the railway line was an obstacle.

In January 1925, when reconstruction was almost complete, this equipment was sold on to the army because local contractors complained of unfair competition. Several communities obtained Decauville track and rolling stock through the agency of the Transport Department.

== Rolling stock ==
=== Steam locomotives ===
Type	Manufacturer	Power	Origin	Units
Dampf	German	30 hp	Military Surplus Office (Inzamelingsdienst)	29
Dampf	Péchot	30 hp	Belgian Army	3
Dampf	Baldwin	45 hp	Belgian Army	2
Dampf	Baldwin	45 hp	British Army	24
Dampf	Cooke	45 hp	British Army	12
Dampf	Barclay	20 hp	British Army	17
			Summe:	87

=== Motorlokomotiven ===
Type	Manufacturer	Power	Origin	Units
Petrol	Overland	15 hp	Belgian Army	5
Petrol	Simplex	20 hp	Belgian Army	2
Petrol	Simplex	20 hp	British Army	37
Petrol	Simplex	40 hp	British Army	2
Petrol	Simplex	40 hp	Belgian Army	8
Petrol	Petrol-electric	45 hp	British Army	15
			Total:	69

=== Goods wagons ===
Origin	Load per wagon	Units	Total load
Military Surplus Office (Inzamelingsdienst) and Belgian Army	1 t	250	250 t
Military Surplus Office and Belgian Army	2 t	75	150 t
Military Surplus Office und Belgian Army	3,5 t	109	380 t
Military Surplus Office	3,5 t	111	388 t
Military Surplus Office	5 t	359	1795 t
British Army	3,5 t	188	658 t
Britisch Army	9 t	11	99 t
Britisch Army	9 t	746	6714 t
Belgian Army	8 t	21	168 t
Belgian Army	9 t	50	450 t
	Total:	1974	11.352 t

=== Tank wagons ===
Origine	Volumen per wagon	Units	Total volume
Belgian Army	8,000 litres (1,800 imp gal; 2,100 US gal)	2	16.000 litres (3.520 imp gal; 4.227 US gal)
Belgian Army	6,500 litres (1,400 imp gal; 1,700 US gal)	16	104.000 litres (22.877 imp gal; 27.474 US gal)
Military Surplus Office	5,000 litres (1,100 imp gal; 1,300 US gal)	36	180.000 litres (39.594 imp gal; 47.551 US gal)

== Rail track ==
The inventory of October 1920 listed the following track lengths:

- Lines in service: 445 km.
- Lines leased out: 120 km
- Lines to be dismantled: 100 km
- New lines to be laid: 14 km
- Tracks in storage at the storage yard: 21 km
  - Total: 700 km

== External links to historic photographs ==
- Arthur Brusselle: Rail wagon in the Devastated Territories after the end of World War I.
- Arthur Brusselle: Geluveld near Zonnebeke in the Devastated Territories after the end of World War I.
