= Joost Caen =

Joost M. A. Caen is a Flemish independent artist and glass conservator since 1982. In his workshop, he creates contemporary stained-glass windows for churches and secular buildings. In 2003 he was one of the first stained-glass artists who incorporate solar cells into a glass creation. This work can be seen in the entrance hall of the District House at Deurne, Belgium. Caen also conserves stained-glass panels and windows, mainly for museums and collectors.

Caen is the first in Belgium to be promoted to "doctor in conservation-restoration" (University of Antwerp, November 2009). At present, he is full professor at the same university and chairs the research group "Heritage & Sustainability." He regularly publishes with Brepols about stained glass. For his main research on small glass panes and panels, he works together with art historian Cornelis J. Berserik from The Hague, Netherlands.

== Biography ==
Caen was born at Roeselare on April 26, 1959. He is married to Friede Cloet.

For the first four years of his life, he lived in Roeselare, where his parents are building a modernistic house in Hooglede-Gits. He attended primary school at the Stadsjongensschool in Roeselare between 1965 and 1972. In 1971 he began attending weekend courses at the Municipal Fine Arts Academy in Roeselare. For his secondary studies, Caen attended the Klein Seminarie-college at Roeselare. During the six years of his secondary education, he continued to attend classes at the academy.

In 1978 he started at the Royal Academy of Fine Arts in Antwerp. Although Caen initially planned to specialize in mural painting, he became fascinated by the media of glass and stained glass and began taking lessons in "Monumental Arts" and in classic glass-painting and conservation-restoration of stained glass. After four years at the Royal Academy, he obtained diplomas in "Monumental Arts" and teaching art. Caen continued studying "Monumental Arts" during two years at the National Higher Institute.

== Professional career ==
After finishing the Royal Academy of Fine Arts in 1982, Caen founded his own workshop and began teaching at several art schools in Brasschaat, Bruges, Temse, and Mechelen. Eventually, he was employed full-time at the Art Academy of Brasschaat. In 1988 the National Higher Institute and Royal Academy of Fine Arts requested that Caen help establish a department in Conservation Studies at the institute. He also began working at the Antwerp Royal Academy of Fine Arts in conservation and restoration. In 1997, he became one of the founding fathers of ENCoRE (the European Network for Conservation-Restoration Education).

He began his scientific research with the University of Antwerp in 1990, where he promoted the academic development of Conservation Studies. He undertook his PhD-research between 2006 and 2009 and published his thesis entitled "The Production of Stained Glass in the County of Flanders and the Duchy of Brabant from the XVth to the XVIIIth Centuries: Materials and Techniques." "Conservation Studies" was eventually incorporated into the "Faculty of Design Sciences" of the University of Antwerp in 2013, where Caen is full professor in the Heritage Department.

== Stained-Glass Projects ==
- Bishop Palace, Antwerp (1992–1993)
- Town Hall, Antwerp (1994–1995)
- Church of the Capuchin Friars, Ostend (2003)
- District House, Antwerp-Deurne (2003)
- Evangelische Kirche, Eppendorf, Bochum (2005)
- Retirement Home "Zusters van Liefde", Kortrijk (2005)
- Church of "Saint Brixius," Meise-Sint-Brixius-Rode (2007)
- Monasterium Fonte Avellana (2007- 2010)
- Chapel of the convent of the Birgittines, Trondheim (2008)
- Psychiatric Hospital, Haina (2008)
- Church of "Saint Lambert," Ville-sur-Haine (2008)
- Evangelische Kirche, Lüdinghausen (2011)
- Chapel of the Large Seminary, Namur (2014)
- Abbey Church of "Notre Dame de Bonne Espérance," Echourgnac (2015)
- Convent of the "Zusters van het H. Hart van Maria," Berlaar (2016)
- Church of Saint Lawrence, Hove (2018)

== Conservation Projects ==
- "Caestere" Castle, 15th-16th centuries window, Roeselare-Rumbeke (1991)
- Mayer van den Bergh Museum, 16th-century roundels, Antwerp (1994–1995, 2000–2001, 2002–2003, 2004–2005)
- Abbey ‘t Park’, 17th-century windows Jan de Caumon, Leuven-Heverlee (1994–1995)
- Museum M, 16th-century roundels & 17th-century panel J. De Caumont, Leuven (1996, 2010–2011
- Royal Museums of Art and History, 13th-century panels and 17th-century windows Jan de Caumont, Brussels (1998)
- Chapel of the "Heilig Hartinstituut," window Eugeen Yoors, Leuven-Heverlee (1999)
- "Sint Ludgardis" school, windows Eugeen Yoors, Antwerp (2000–2001)
- Bruggemuseum, 15th century St Georges and St Michael windows and other panels and 16th-century roundels, Bruges (2004–2005, 2014–2015)
- Museum Boijmans van Beuningen, panel Thorn Prikker, Rotterdam (NL) (2012–2013)
- Museum De Lakenhal, 17th-century panel and 20th-century windows and lights, Leiden (2014–2015, 2016, 2017)

== Publications ==
- Y. VANDEN BEMDEN, J. CAEN, W. BERCKMANS, A. MALLIET, L. LAMBRECHTS (1992). Glas in Lood. M&L cahier 1. Brussels: Ministerie van de Vlaamse Gemeenschap.
- C. J. BERSERIK, J. M. A. CAEN (2007). Silver-Stained Roundels and Unipartite Panels before the French Revolution. Flanders, Vol. 1: The Province of Antwerp. Corpus Vitrearum Checklist. Turnhout: Brepols.
- J. M. A. CAEN (2009). The Production of Stained Glass in the County of Flanders and the Duchy of Brabant. From the XVth to the XVIIIth Centuries: Materials and Techniques. PhD publication. Turnhout: Brepols.
- C. J. BERSERIK, J. M. A. CAEN (2011). Silver-Stained Roundels and Unipartite Panels before the French Revolution. Flanders, Vol. 2: The Provinces of East and West-Flanders. Corpus Vitrearum Checklist. Turnhout: Brepols.
- Y. BRUIJNEN, J. CAEN, M. DEBAENE, J. VAN GRIEKEN, P. VAN CALSTER (eds.) (2012). Getekend, Jan R. Een renaissancemeester herontdekt. Exhibition catalogue. Brussels: Mercatorfonds.
- C. J. BERSERIK, J. M. A. CAEN (2014). Silver-Stained Roundels and Unipartite Panels before the French Revolution. Flanders, Vol. 3: The Provinces of Flemish Brabant and Limburg. Corpus Vitrearum Checklist. Brussels: Brepols.
