= James Lahousse =

Belgian footballer

Personal information
- Full name: James Lahousse
- Date of birth: 9 November 1982 (age 43)
- Place of birth: Roeselare, Belgium
- Position: Centre back

Youth career
- –2002: Roeselare

Senior career*
Years	Team	Apps	(Gls)
2002–2007	Roeselare	121	(5)
2007–2009	OH Leuven	56	(5)
2009–2011	Oostende	55	(4)
2011–2012	Boezinge		
2012–2019	Wingene		
- * Club domestic league appearances and goals

James Lahousse (born 9 November 1982) is a retired Belgian professional footballer.

== Career ==
Lahousse started his career with Roeselare in the Belgian Second Division, playing his first match during the 2001–02 season. Lahousse was a key player in the Roeselare team that became third in 2003-04 and narrowly missed out on promotion during the playoffs. In 2004-05 Roeselare did manage to win the playoffs after becoming second, with Lahousse again playing over 30 matches that season. He remained a key player after the promotion, playing 34 matches and scoring two goals in the 2005–06 Belgian First Division. He only featured seldom in the following season, causing him to leave Roeselare in June 2007, when he signed for second division team OH Leuven. Again he became a key player, playing 56 matches in two seasons before moving to Oostende in the same division, where he played 55 matches in two seasons before moving to Boezinge at the fifth level of Belgian football.

Lahousse retired at the end of the 2018–19 season.
