= Laquette =

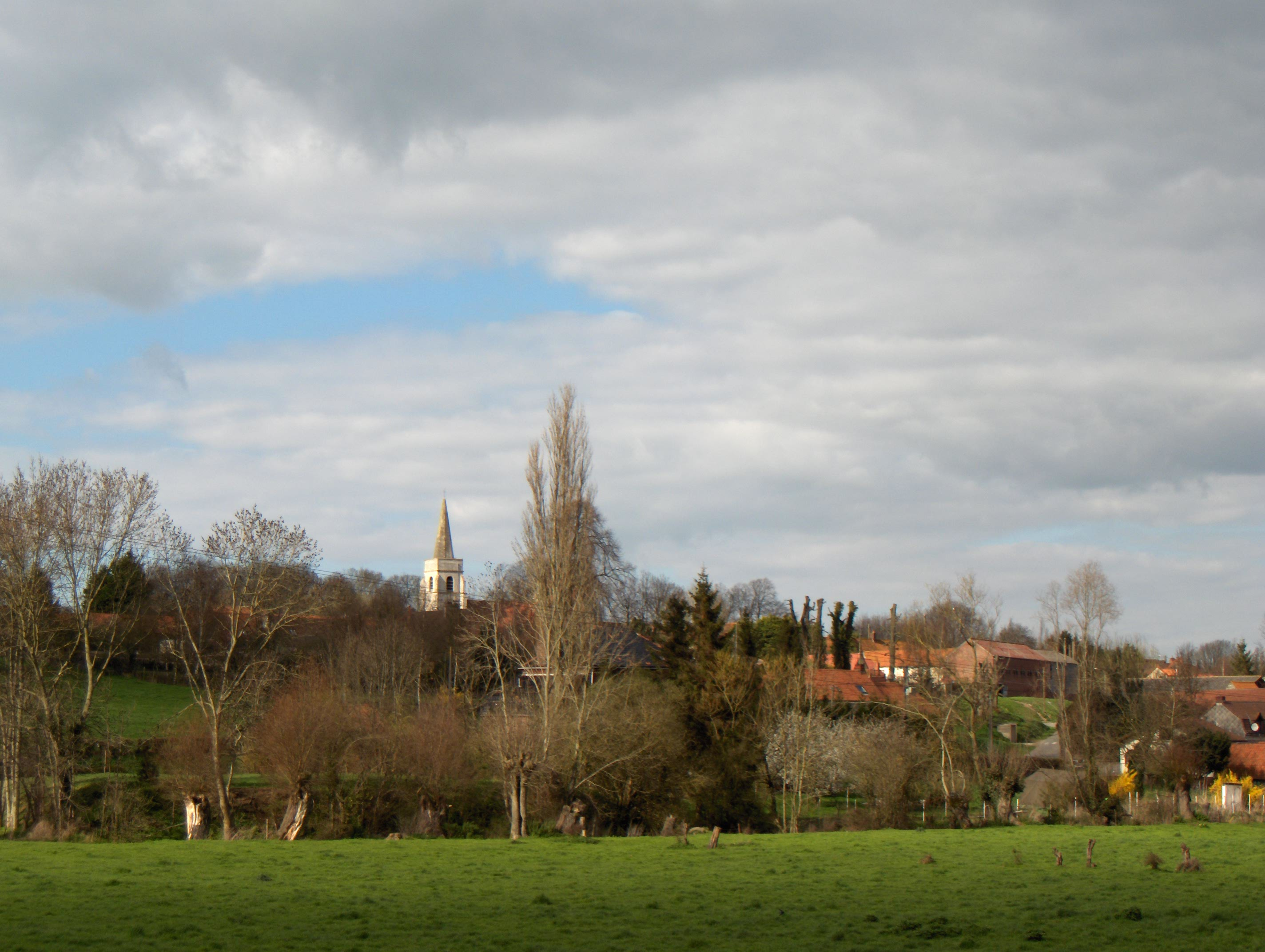

- Location within France Location within Hauts-de-France

Location
- Country: France

Physical characteristics
- Source
  - location: France
- Mouth
  - location: Lys
  - coordinates: 50°38′33″N 2°24′11″E
- Length: 23 km (14 mi)

Basin features
- Progression: Lys→ Scheldt→ North Sea

The Laquette is a river of northern France, right tributary of the Lys. It is 23 km (14 mi) long. It flows into the Lys in Aire-sur-la-Lys.
