= Roeselare =

Roeselare Roeseloare (West Flemish): Roulers (French)
- City and municipality
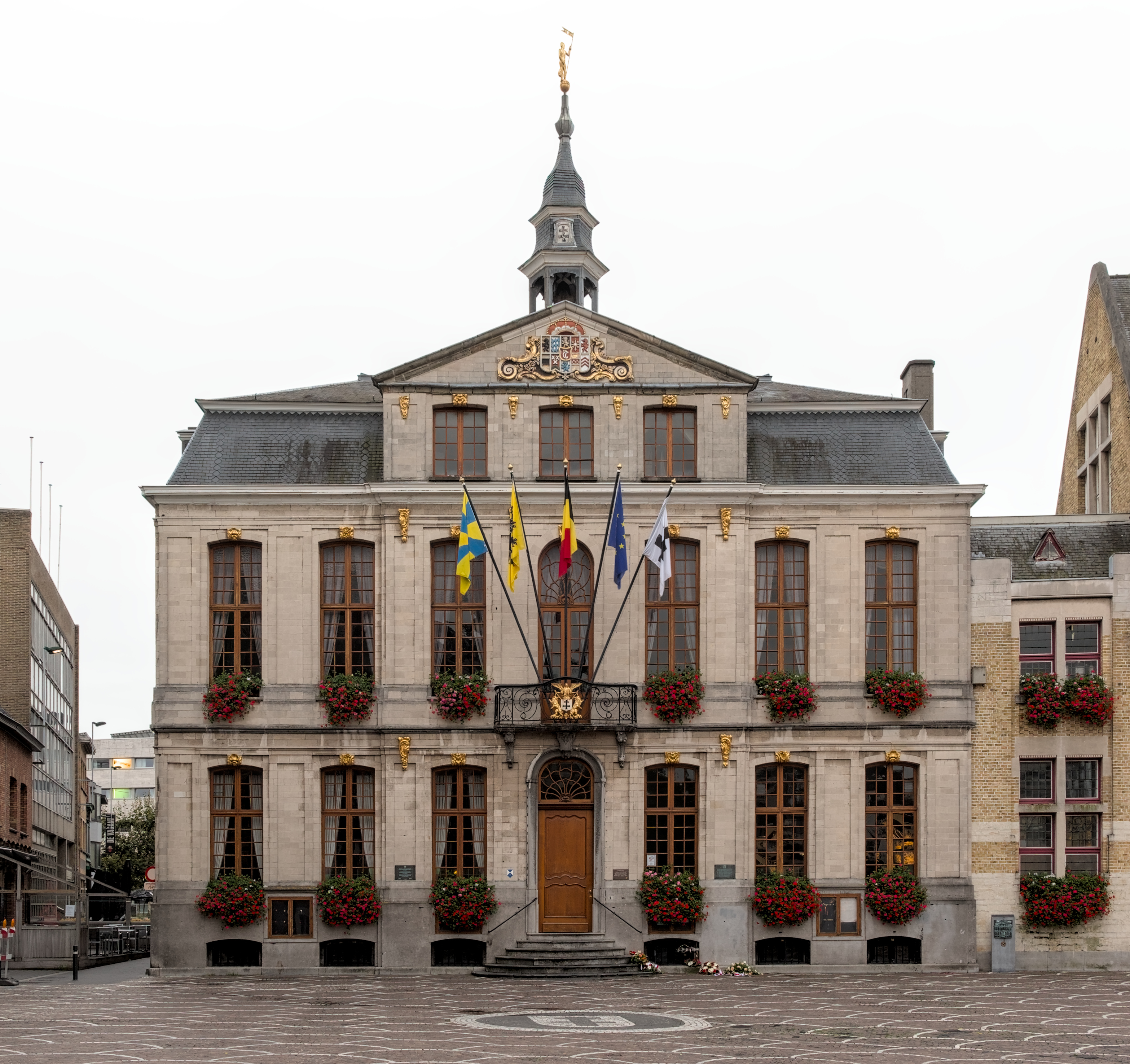
- Town hall

- Flag Coat of arms

- Location of Roeselare in West Flanders
- Interactive map of Roeselare
- Location in Belgium
- Coordinates: 50°56′N 03°07′E
- Country: Belgium
- Community: Flemish Community
- Region: Flemish Region
- Province: West Flanders
- Arrondissement: Roeselare

Government
  - Mayor: Kris Declercq (CD&V)
  - Governing parties: CD&V; Vooruit; Lokaal Liberaal

Area
  - Total: 60.4 km^{2} (23.3 sq mi)

Population (2022-01-01)
  - Total: 64,495
  - Density: 1,070/km^{2} (2,770/sq mi)
- Postal codes: 8800
- NIS code: 36015
- Area codes: 051
- Website: www.roeselare.be

Roeselare (Dutch: [ˈrusəˌlaːrə]; West Flemish: Roeseloare; French: Roulers [ʁulɛʁs]) is a Belgian city and municipality in the Flemish province of West Flanders. The municipality comprises the city of Roeselare proper and the towns of Beveren, Oekene and Rumbeke.

The name of the city is derived from two Germanic words meaning "reed" and "open space", i.e., a marsh in a forest glade. Roeselare's minor seminary is famous for having hosted the famous Flemish poets Guido Gezelle, Albrecht Rodenbach and missionary Jesuit Constant Lievens. The city is also home to the Rodenbach brewery.

== History ==
=== Origins and Middle Ages ===
Traces of early dwellings have been found in the area, including prehistoric flint tools, Gallo-Roman wells, and a small 9th century Frankish building. The first mention of Roslar dates from a document dated 821 or 822, whereby the former domain of the Menapii, also called the Rollare villa in later documents, was given to Elnon Abbey. According to legend, Baldwin Iron Arm, Count of Flanders, kidnapped Judith, the daughter of Charles the Bold in 862 in Senlis and brought her to a fortress that used to be where the present Rumbeke Castle stands. The Roeselare area soon became part of the County of Flanders. The rights to build fortifications and to hold a public market date from 957, during the lordship of Baldwin III.

The city received its charter of freedoms in the mid-13th century, period in which it also built its first city hall and belfry. The manufacturing of cloth was then the main driver of the local economy. The few defensive walls that the city had were no match against the forces of Maximilian of Austria, who utterly destroyed the city at the end of the 15th century. The market hall and Saint Michael church were rebuilt in the year 1500.

=== 16th century to Waterloo ===
The center of Roeselare belonged throughout history to the Fiefdom of Wijnendale and therefore fell under the responsibility of the House of Cleves in the 15th and 16th century and under the Dukes of Palatinate-Neuburg in the 17th and 18th century.

The 16th century proved to be disastrous for the city as the Spanish rulers ruthlessly repressed any desire for autonomy in the Low Countries, both political and religious. Iconoclasts stormed the city in 1566 and destroyed most of the sacred art. The Eighty Years' War that followed put an end to the wool supply from England, which in turn resulted in the disappearance of the cloth industry in Roeselare. Starting with the reigns of Archdukes Albert and Isabella, the beginning of the 17th century was a lot kinder to Roeselare. New churches and religious houses were built and old ones repaired. New schools also appeared in the city and the cloth industry found a new life. The second half of the century, however, was marked by the wars of Louis XIV and Marshal Turenne against the Spanish, with further plundering and misery. The Treaty of Nijmegen in 1678 made Roeselare a border city, a situation that encouraged smuggling rather than regular economic development.

The 18th century was a generally prosperous period that saw the construction of the current city hall. In 1794, the area was the scene of a French victory over the Austrians. The victors imposed deep reforms on the country, such as a new legal system (the Napoleonic Code) and the curtailment of religious freedoms, which lasted until the Concordat of 1802 between Napoleon and Pope Pius VII.

=== Modern era ===
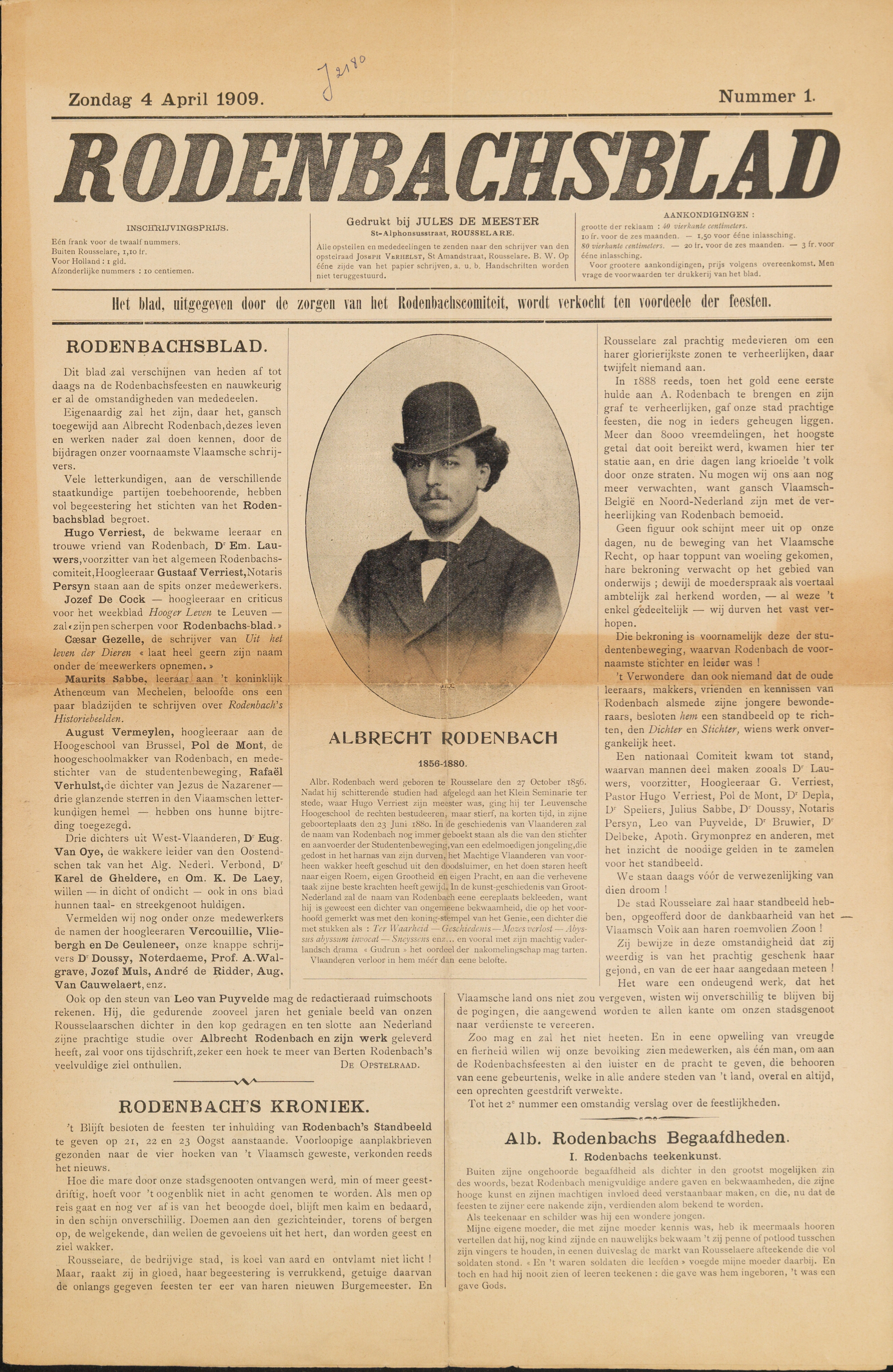
Excerpt of a newspaper called after Albrecht Rodenbach, the Rodenbachsblad from 1909. Preserved in the Ghent University Library.

Several members of the Rodenbach family of Roeselare took part in the events leading to Belgian Independence in 1830. Other members of the family became soldiers or diplomats. Pedro and Alexander founded the brewery which is still in operation today. The general economy, however, did not fare very well as mechanization displaced many small artisans. The advent of the railway and the digging of a canal linking the city to the river Lys in the 1860s were beneficial. World War I stopped the economic boom in its tracks as the city became a large camp ground for the German troops fighting on the front lines in neighbouring Diksmuide. By the end of the war, two thirds of the city was destroyed due to British bombing. The Transport Office of the Devastated Territories of West Flanders was set up in Spanjestraat 56 after the war.

During World War II, on 27 and 28 May 1940, the Belgian army lost its last stand here against the advancing Wehrmacht. This was followed by four years of German occupation, although without too much destruction. The city was liberated by the Polish 1st Armoured Division in September 1944 (see also Belgium–Poland relations).

The city today is a regional center that provides commercial and media services, as well as a variety of occupations in the food industry, to the surrounding area.

== Geography ==
The municipality comprises the city of Roeselare and the deelgemeentes of Beveren, Oekene and Rumbeke. There are several smaller hamlets in the municipality of Roeselare. In Rumbeke along the N32 lies the village of Zilverberg. The village of Beitem is about three kilometres further south along the same road.

The city itself consists of a few catholic parishes, including Saint Michael, Saint Amand, Sacred Heart, Saint Joseph, Saint Godelieve and Saint Mary (in the Krottegem quarter). There's also a protestant church.

Roeselare shares borders with the following villages and towns:

- Oostnieuwkerke (municipality Staden)
- Hooglede (municipality Hooglede)
- Gits (municipality Hooglede)
- Lichtervelde (municipality Lichtervelde)
- Koolskamp (municipality Ardooie)
- Ardooie, with the hamlet of Tasse (municipality Ardooie)
- Kachtem and Izegem
- Sint-Eloois-Winkel (municipality Ledegem)
- Rollegem-Kapelle (municipality Ledegem)
- Ledegem (municipality Ledegem)
- Moorslede (municipality Moorslede)
- Passendale (municipality Zonnebeke).

== Shopping ==
The Ooststraat is the most popular shopping street in the city. Annual events that are important for the shopping business are the Winkelnacht (Shopping night), the kermesse fairs, and Christmas shopping. Many festivities such as a carnival and the Groote Stooringe festival set the whole city in motion and go beyond the purely commercial aspect.

A tradition in Roeselare is the weekly morning market on Tuesdays at the main square, the Botermarkt and the Polenplein. These three sites are connected by traffic-calmed zones. On 1 May Labour Day is celebrated at the Stationsplein.

== Sights ==
- The rococo city hall on the central market square dates from the 18th century. The city hall, market hall, and belfry are classified by UNESCO as a World Heritage Site (part of Belfries of Belgium and France).
- Museum dedicated to Polish General Stanisław Maczek and soldiers of the Polish 1st Armoured Division at a German communications bunker from World War II.
- The Rodenbach brewery was founded in 1821. The tour of the facilities includes an explanation of the process used to make this one-of-a-kind beer style.
- The Renaissance-style Rumbeke Castle dates from 1538 and is located within the Sterrebos forest. Now, it houses the company Busworld. The nearby Kazandmolen is the only one of the area's thirteen windmills to have survived until today.
- KOERS Museum, unique bicycle museum.
- The Canal Roeselare-Leie that was completed in 1872, provides not only an economic advantage but creates great cycling and walking opportunities also.
- The Roeselare railway station is an important place in the city with a car-free square and a bus station.
- The Eaststreet is an important shopping-street.
- Old municipal cemetery with Belgian, British, French and Polish military quarters from both world wars, and a monument to the Polish 1st Armoured Division
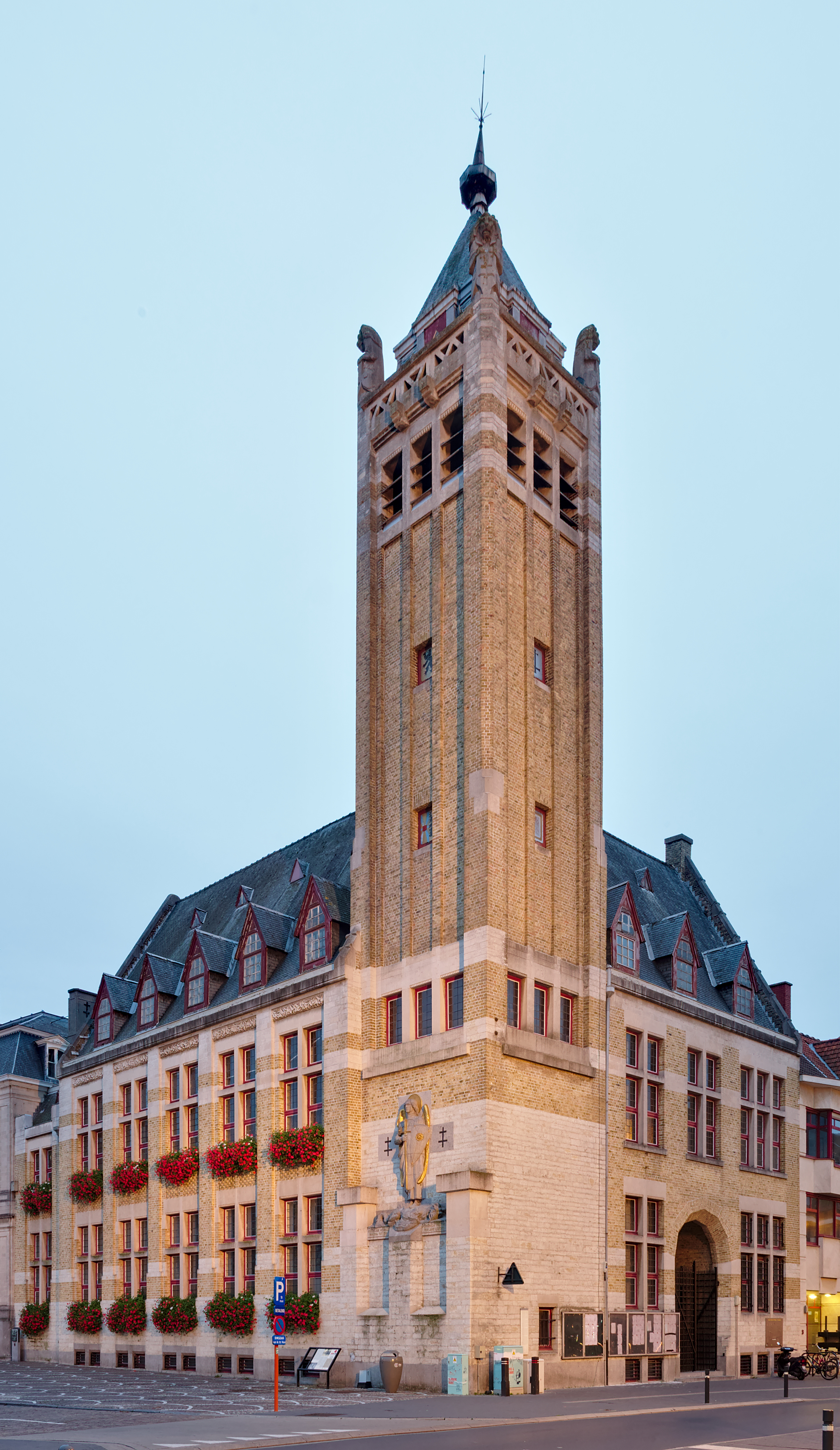
Town hall with belfry

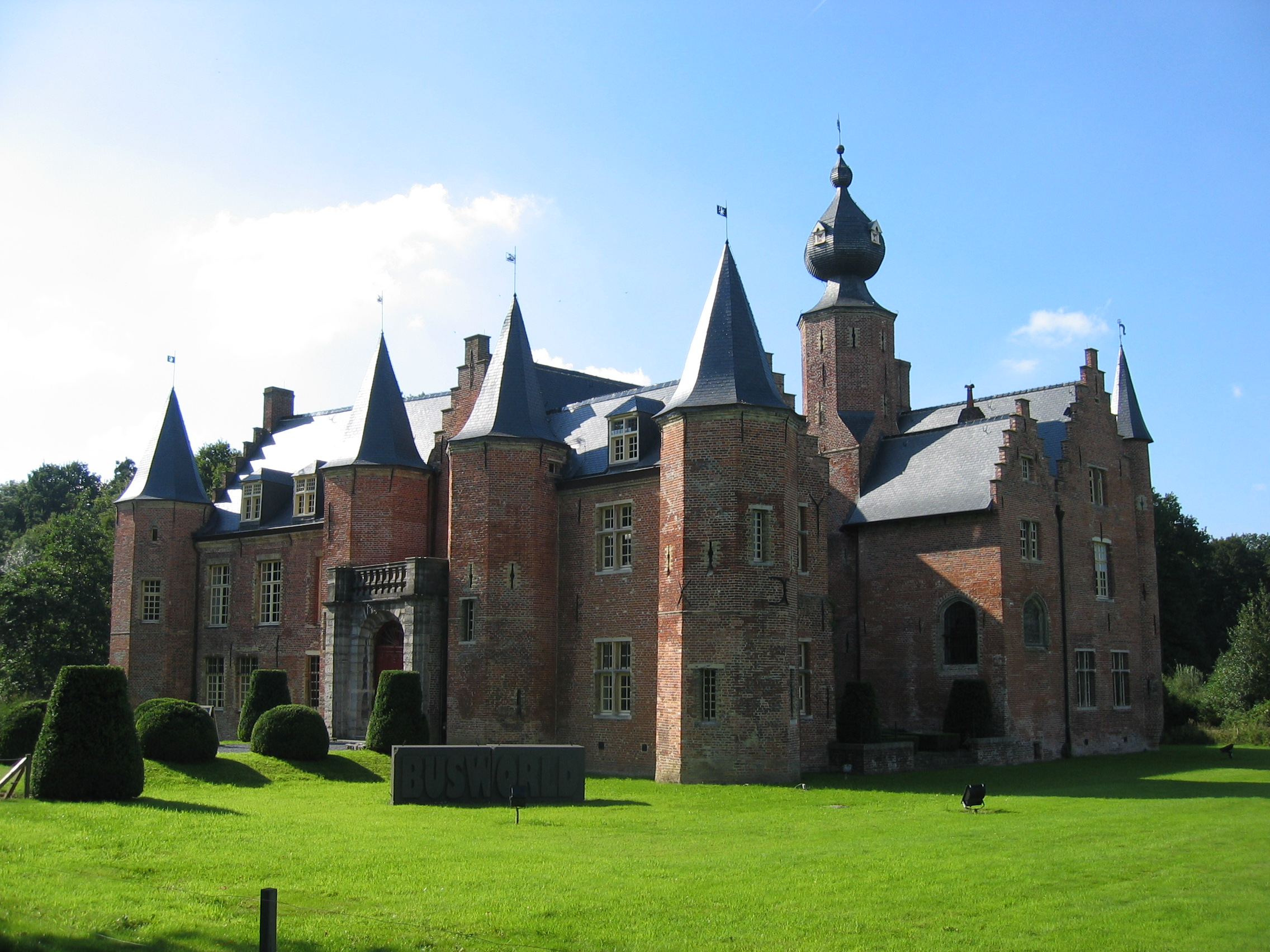
Rumbeke Castle near Roeselare

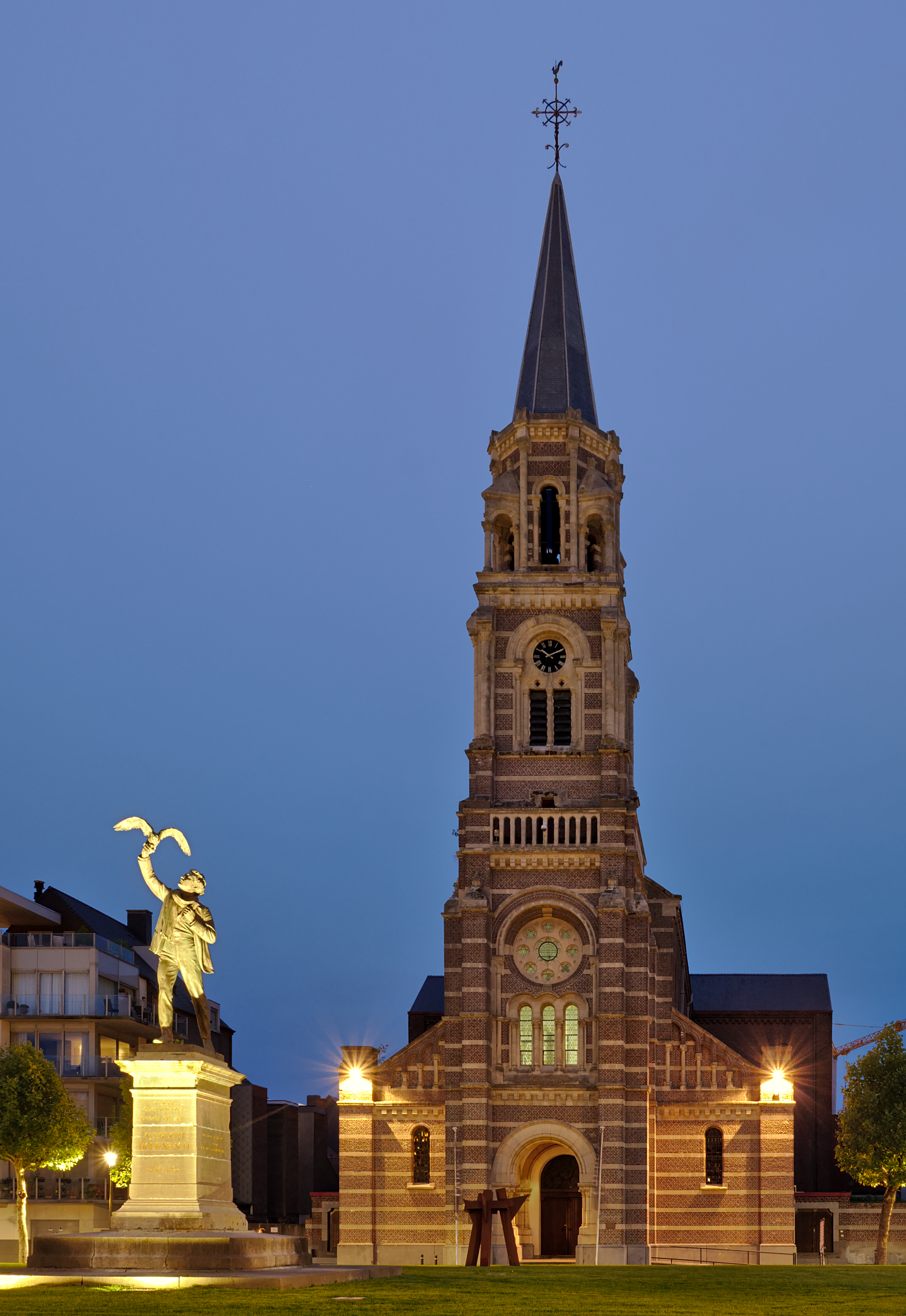
Sint-Amand church

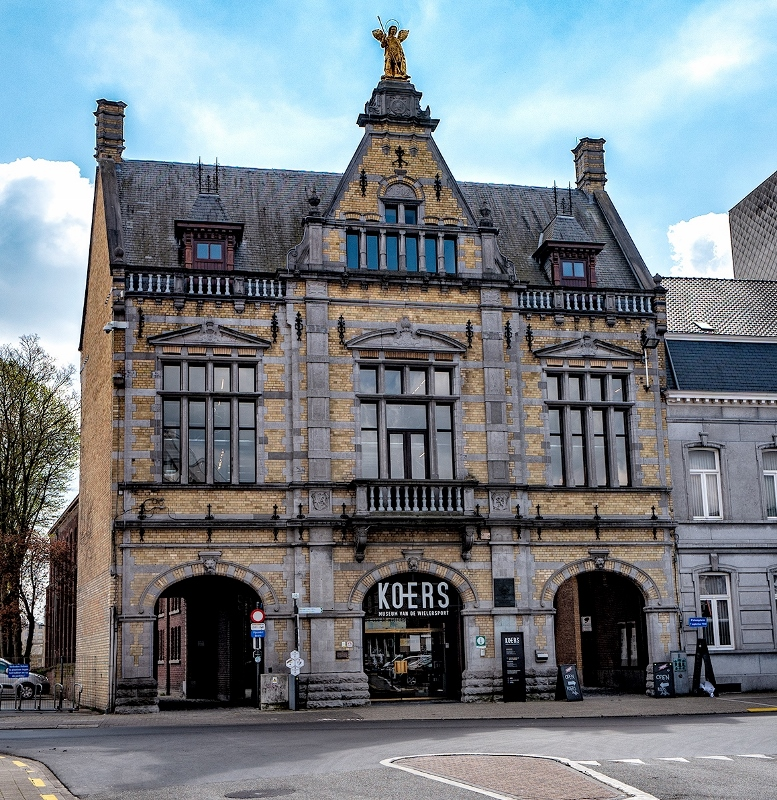
KOERS Museum

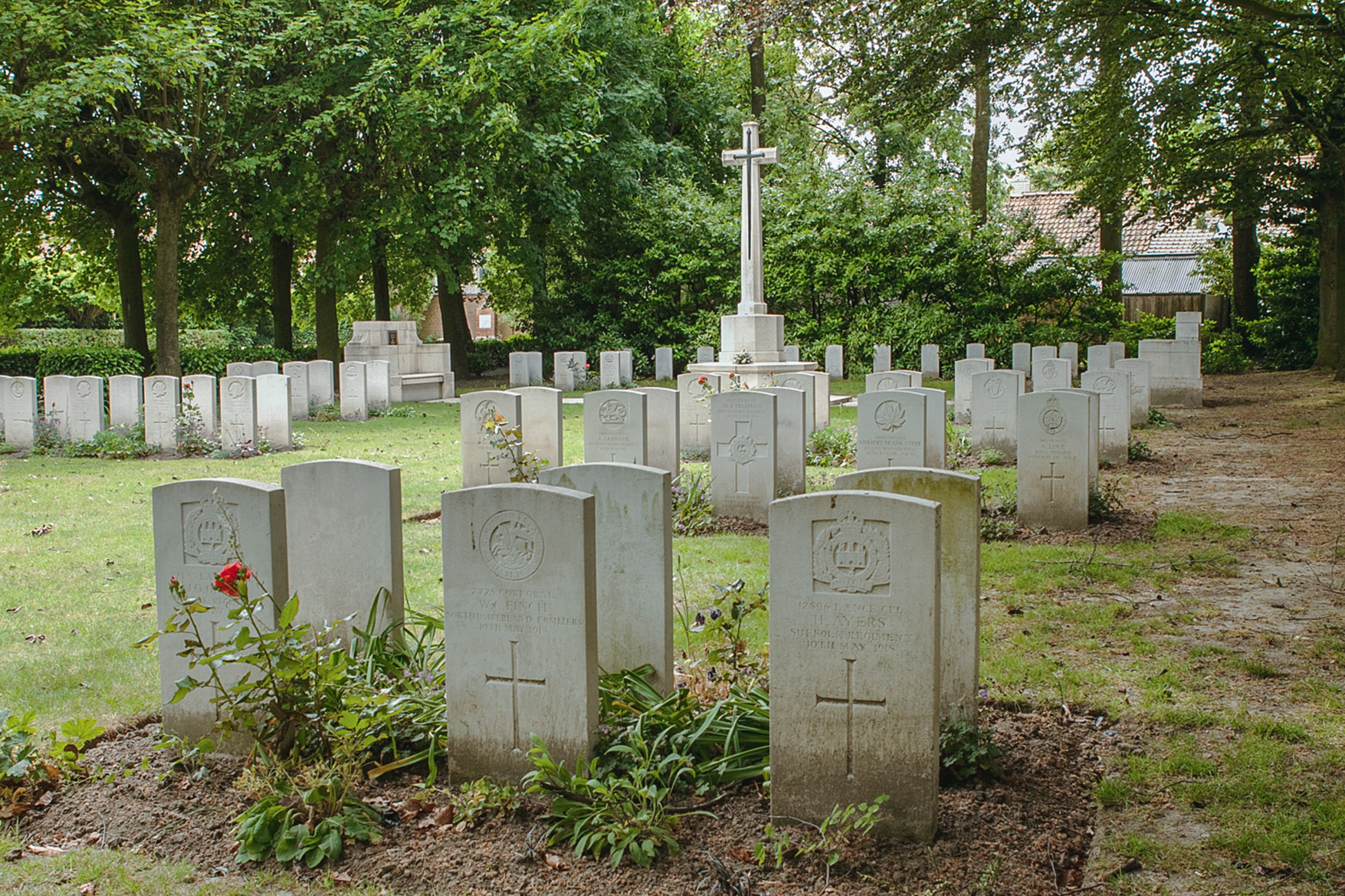
British Commonwealth Plot from World War I

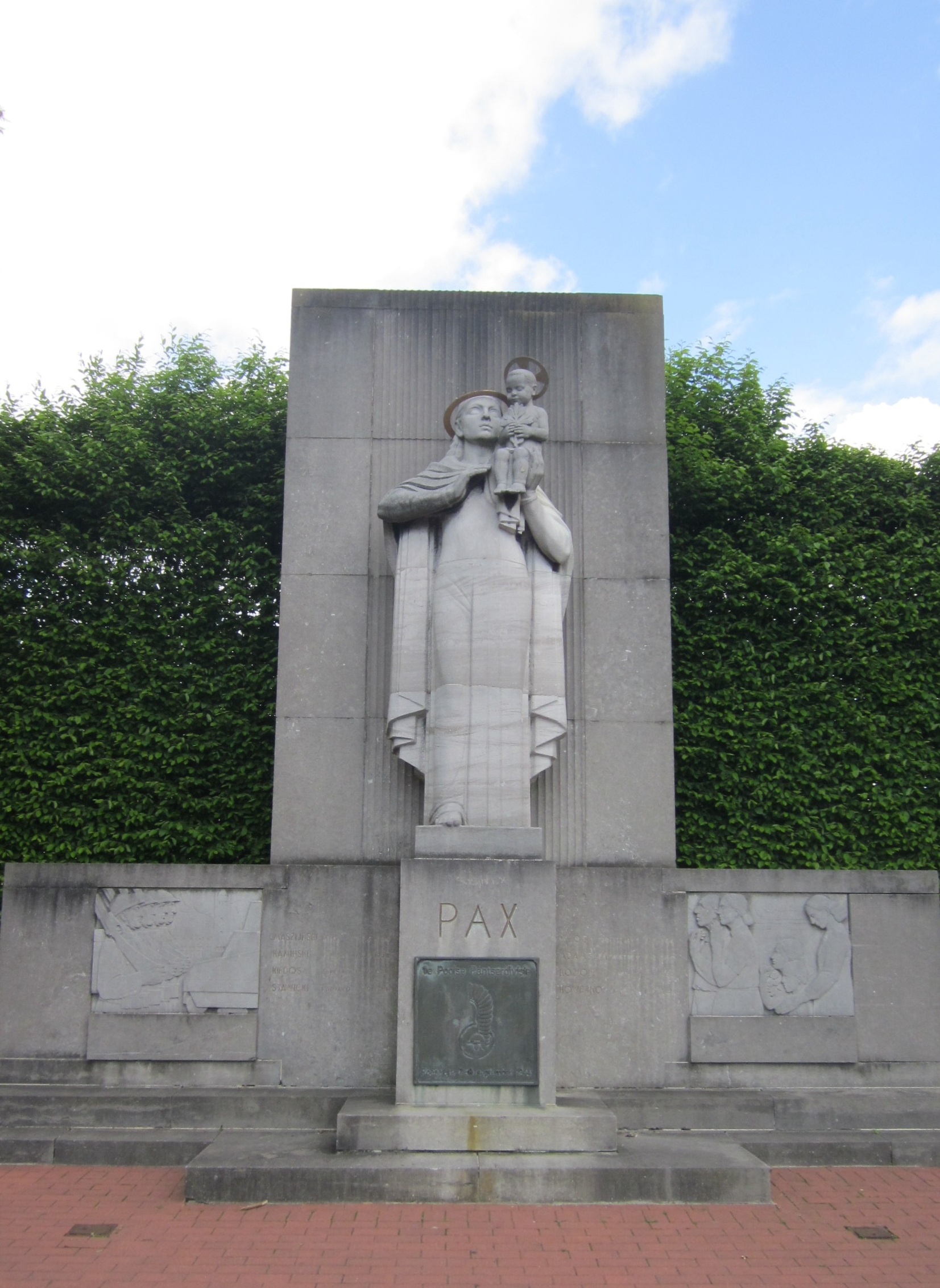
Polish 1st Armoured Division Monument

== Folklore ==
Roeselare houses a whole family of giant puppets. The head of the family, Rolarius – who is also the alleged founder of the city – his wife Carlotta and son Opsinjoorke, as well as several other relatives, appear at festivities and carnivals, dancing to the beat of the giants' song.

Roeselare also houses some kind of folklore around the character named Peegie, he's a slick merchant, and is in a way based on the real character of the town as a merchant town in his early days.

== Sports ==
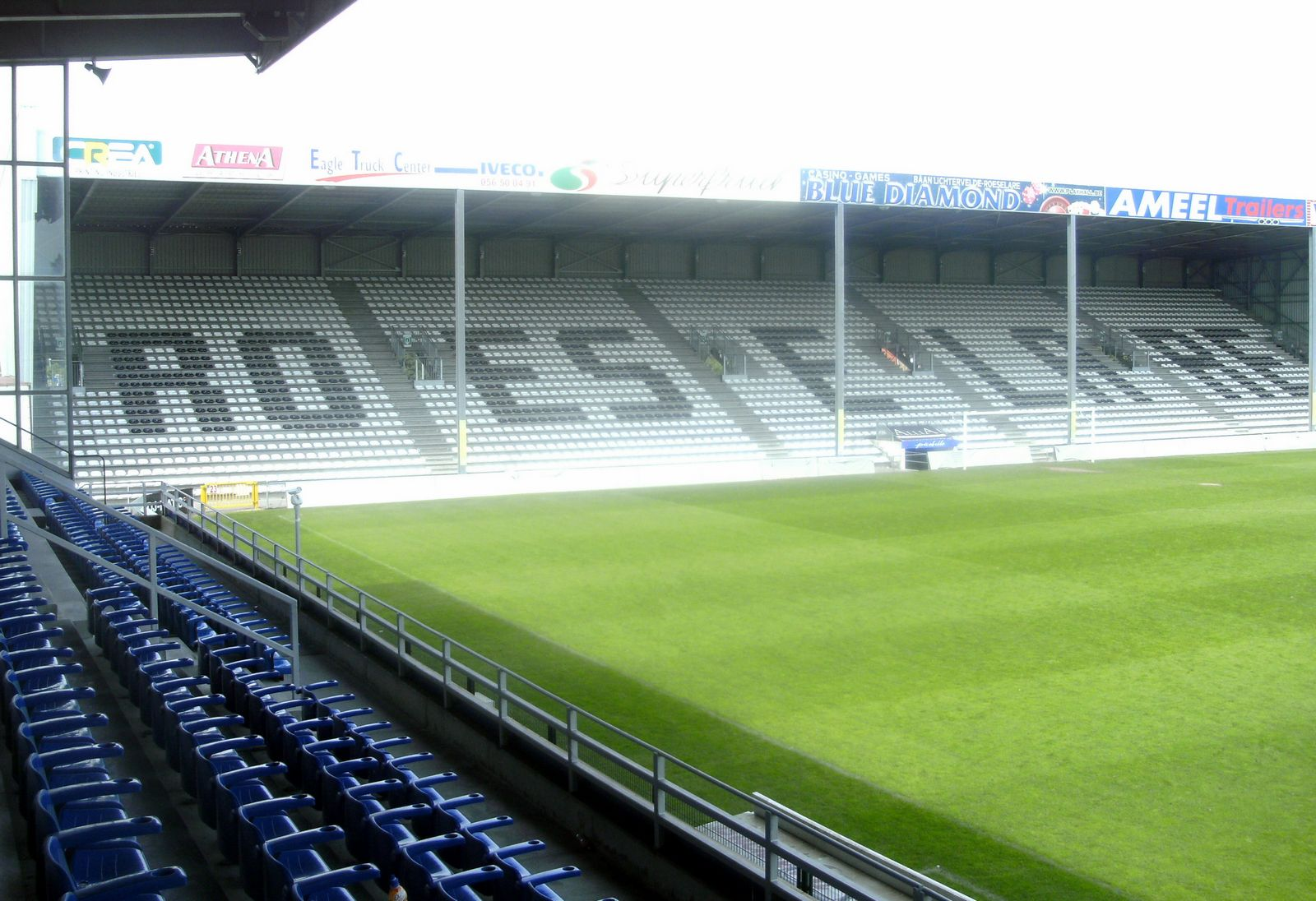
Schiervelde Stadion

Roeselare was the hometown of soccer team KSV Roeselare who played in the Belgian Second Division until their bankruptcy in 2020. The volleyteam Knack Randstad Roeselare who plays the CEV Champions League. Formula E driver Stoffel Vandoorne also lives in Roeselare.

== Twin cities ==
Roeselare is twinned with the town of Clonmel in County Tipperary, Ireland.

== Famous inhabitants ==
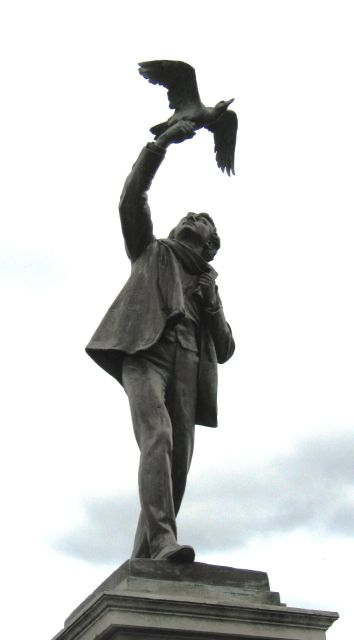
Albrecht Rodenbach, by Jules Lagae

- Paul Bulcke (born 1954), businessman, former CEO of Nestlé
- Joost Caen (born 1959), stained glass artist
- Marthe Cnockaert (1892–1966), World War I nurse and spy for the British (from the village of Westrozebeke but was resident in Roeselare during the war)
- Frédérik Deburghgraeve (born 1973), swimmer and Olympic gold medal winner
- Rita Demeester (1946–1993), poet and writer
- Guido Gezelle (1830–1899), poet
- Charles Goddeeris, builder and father of Flemish Detroit community
- Jan Himpe (1921–2007), musician and composer famous for the local evergreen "We zijn van 't oude Roeselare"
- James Lahousse (born 1982), retired Belgian professional footballer
- Jean-Pierre Monseré (1948–1971), cyclist and 1970 World Champion
- Albrecht Rodenbach (1856–1880), poet
- Patrick Sercu (1944–2019), cyclist and Olympic gold medal winner
- Stoffel Vandoorne (born 1992), Former Formula 1 driver for McLaren and 2021–22 Formula E World Championship winner
- Frédéric Vervisch (born 1986), racing driver
- Adrian Willaert (c.1490–1562), Renaissance-era composer (birth in Roeselare uncertain)
