= Rumbeke =

Section of Roeselare, Belgium

Coordinates: 50°56′00″N 3°09′14″E

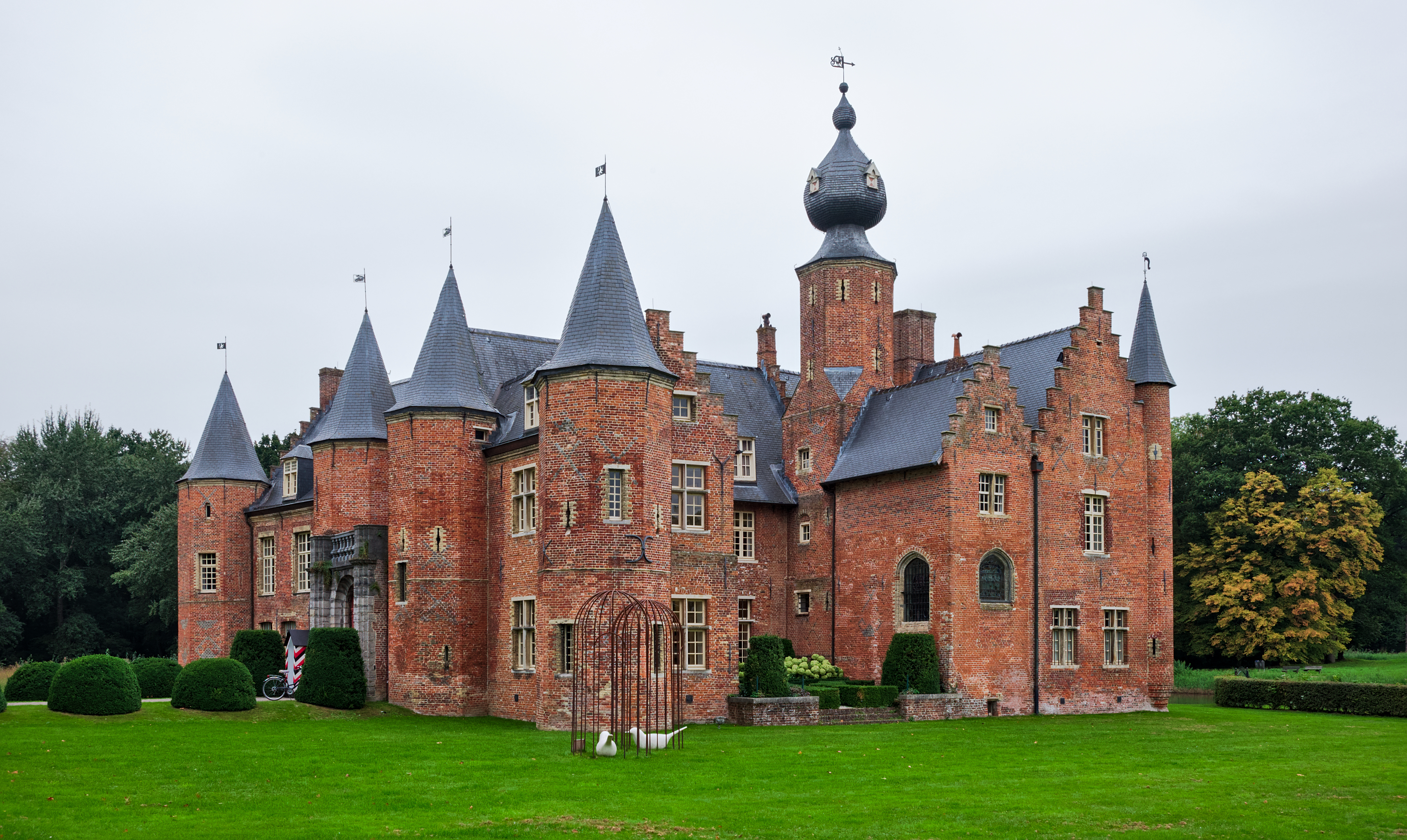
Castle of Rumbeke

Rumbeke is a town in the Belgian municipality of Roeselare in the province of West Flanders. It is most known as the location of Rumbeke Castle. Rumbeke was an independent municipality before the fusion of the Belgian municipalities in 1977. Through new residential areas and industrial sites, such as along the Roeselare-Leie Canal, the town centre has become fused with the urban area of Roeselare. On the territory of the former municipality of Rumbeke, there are still the hamlets Zilverberg and Beitem, both of which also have their own parish.

== History ==
The oldest known mention of Rumbeke is in the 12th century as Rumbeca (wide stream). Rumbeke was part of the castellania of Ypres. There were four heerlijkheden, of which Rumbeke was the most important.

Starting from the 16th century, the cultivation of flax, and also the processing of flax into fabrics, was of great importance. Spinning and weaving at home was very common. In 1918, during World War 1, the town suffered heavy damage from weapon fire.

== Famous cheesemaking ==
According to the prestigious French cheese competition “Concours International de Lyon”, the best cheese in the world comes from cheese farm Groendal in Rumbeke. The new cheese 'Ancienne Belgique' received a perfect score of 100 out of 100.

== Notable sights ==
- Rumbeke castle with adjacent forest (Sterrebos). The castle was built between 1520 and 1535, and is one of the oldest Renaissance castles in the country.
- The Baljuwhuis
- Saint Peter and Saint Paul Church
- Kazandmolen, a gristmill. This mill is the only remaining mill of the former 13 that existed in Rumbeke.

== Notable inhabitants ==
- Adriaan Willaert, composer of the Franco-Flemish school
- Odile Defraye, the first Belgian to win the Tour de France
- Alexander Rodenbach, former mayor of Rumbeke in the 19th century
- Edmond Van der Schelden, historian, priest and writer
- Stoffel Vandoorne, Formula One racer
