= Soubry =

Soubry is a surname. Notable people with the surname include:

- Anna Soubry (born 1956), British politician
- Paul Soubry, Canadian business executive
