= Rumbeke Castle =

Renaissance Castle in Rumbeke in West Flanders, Belgium

Coordinates: 50°55′34″N 3°08′16″E

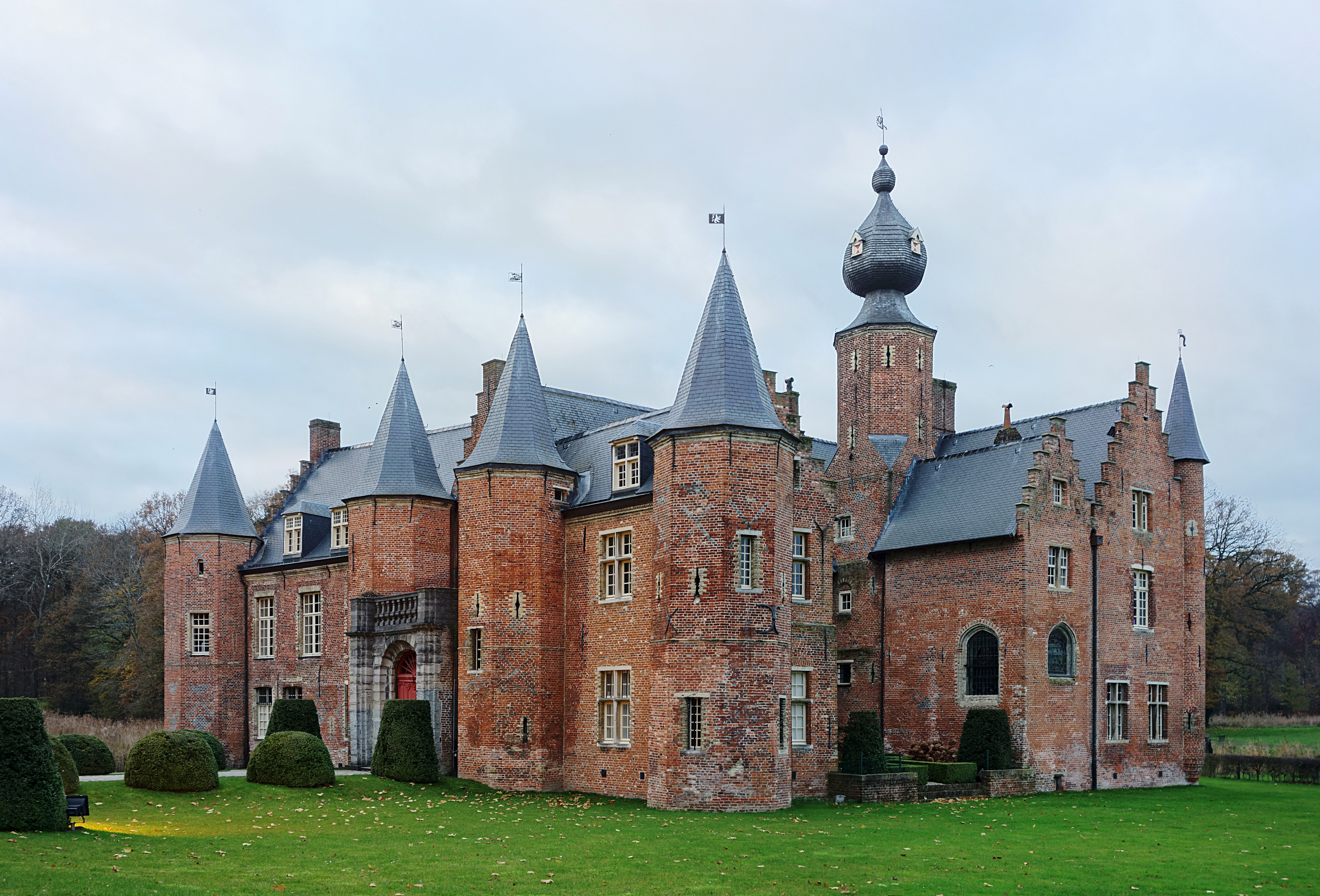
Rumbeke Castle

Rumbeke Castle (Dutch: Kasteel van Rumbeke) is a historical building in Rumbeke in West Flanders, Belgium, one of the oldest Renaissance castles in the country. Rumbeke Castle is situated at an altitude of 25 meters.

Although most of the building was built during the Renaissance period, on the site of a far older fortress, it gained some slightly Neoclassical features after its renovation during the 18th century. During those renovations, the adjacent forest, the Sterrebos or the Star Forest, was added to its grounds. The forest was modelled after the Prater park in Vienna.

According to legend, Baldwin Iron Arm, Count of Flanders, kidnapped Judith, the daughter of Charles the Bald in 862 in Senlis and brought her to the fortress that used to be at the very location where the present castle now stands. With the intervention of the Pope, the two lovers married in Auxerre, which then resulted in the creation of the County of Flanders.

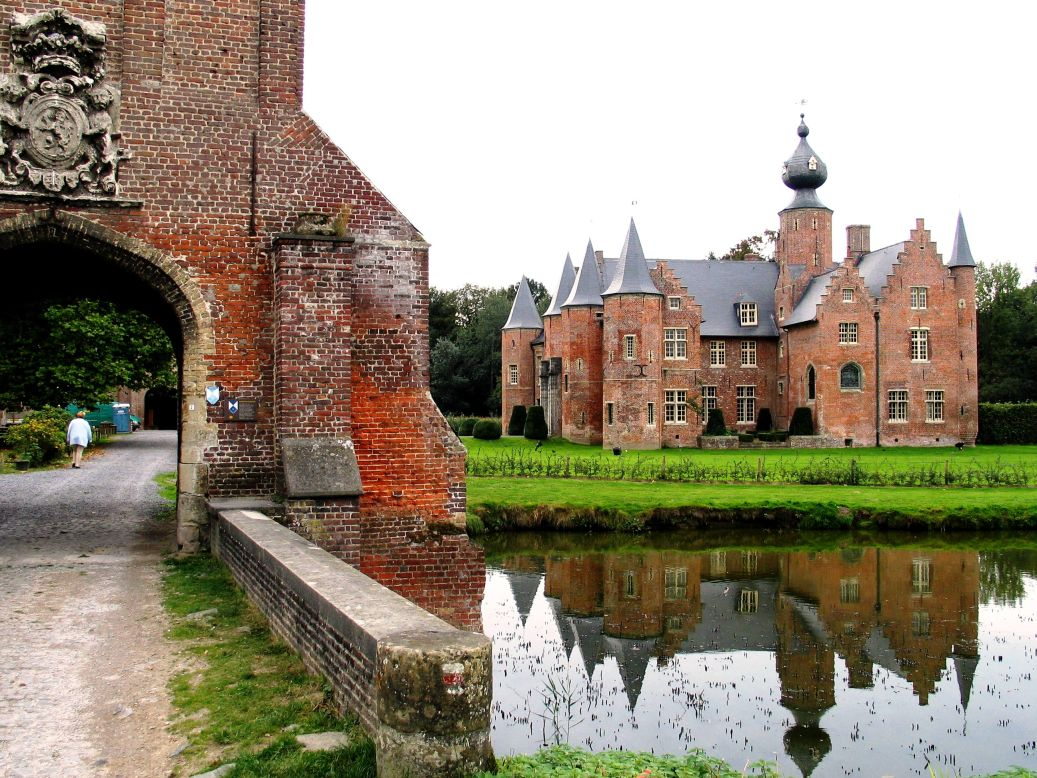
Gate

For centuries, the castle was owned by the counts of Thiennes and Limburg Stirum. The castle of Rumbeke suffered damage during the invasion of Flanders by French king Louis XIV, as well as during the French Revolution and in both world wars more than a century later. In fact, during World War I, it was taken over by the Germans and became for a short period of time, the home of Baron Manfred von Richthofen, better known as the Red Baron, who was credited with shooting down 80 enemy aircraft in his brightly painted red airplane.

The castle can be seen in the movie That Lucky Touch, a comedy which was partially shot in Rumbeke in 1975, starring Roger Moore and Shelley Winters.

== See also ==
- List of castles in Belgium
