= Oostrozebeke =

Oostrozebeke Ôostrôzebeke (West Flemish)
- Municipality
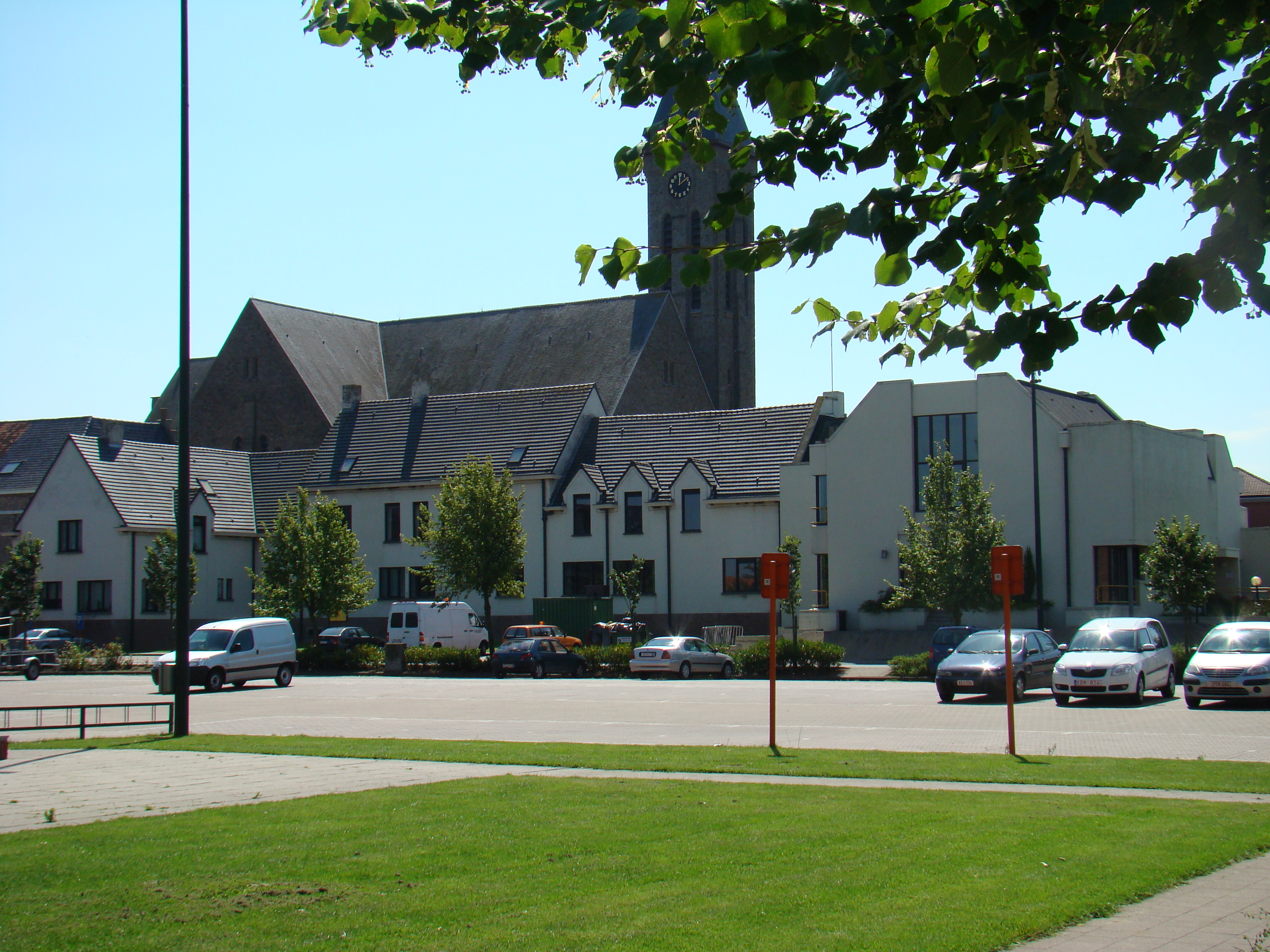
- Administrative centre

- Flag Coat of arms

- Location of Oostrozebeke in West Flanders
- Interactive map of Oostrozebeke
- Location in Belgium
- Coordinates: 50°55′N 03°20′E
- Country: Belgium
- Community: Flemish Community
- Region: Flemish Region
- Province: West Flanders
- Arrondissement: Tielt

Government
  - Mayor: Luc Derudder (Oostrozebeke.nu)
  - Governing party: Oostrozebeke.nu

Area
  - Total: 16.73 km^{2} (6.46 sq mi)

Population (2018-01-01)
  - Total: 7,849
  - Density: 469.2/km^{2} (1,215/sq mi)
- Postal codes: 8780
- NIS code: 37010
- Area codes: 056
- Website: www.oostrozebeke.be

Oostrozebeke (Dutch: [oːstˈroːzəˌbeːkə]; West Flemish: Ôostrôzebeke) is a municipality located in the Belgian province of West Flanders. The municipality comprises only the town of Oostrozebeke proper. On January 1, 2018 Oostrozebeke had a total population of 7,849. The total area is 16.62 km^{2} which gives a population density of 472 inhabitants per km^{2}.

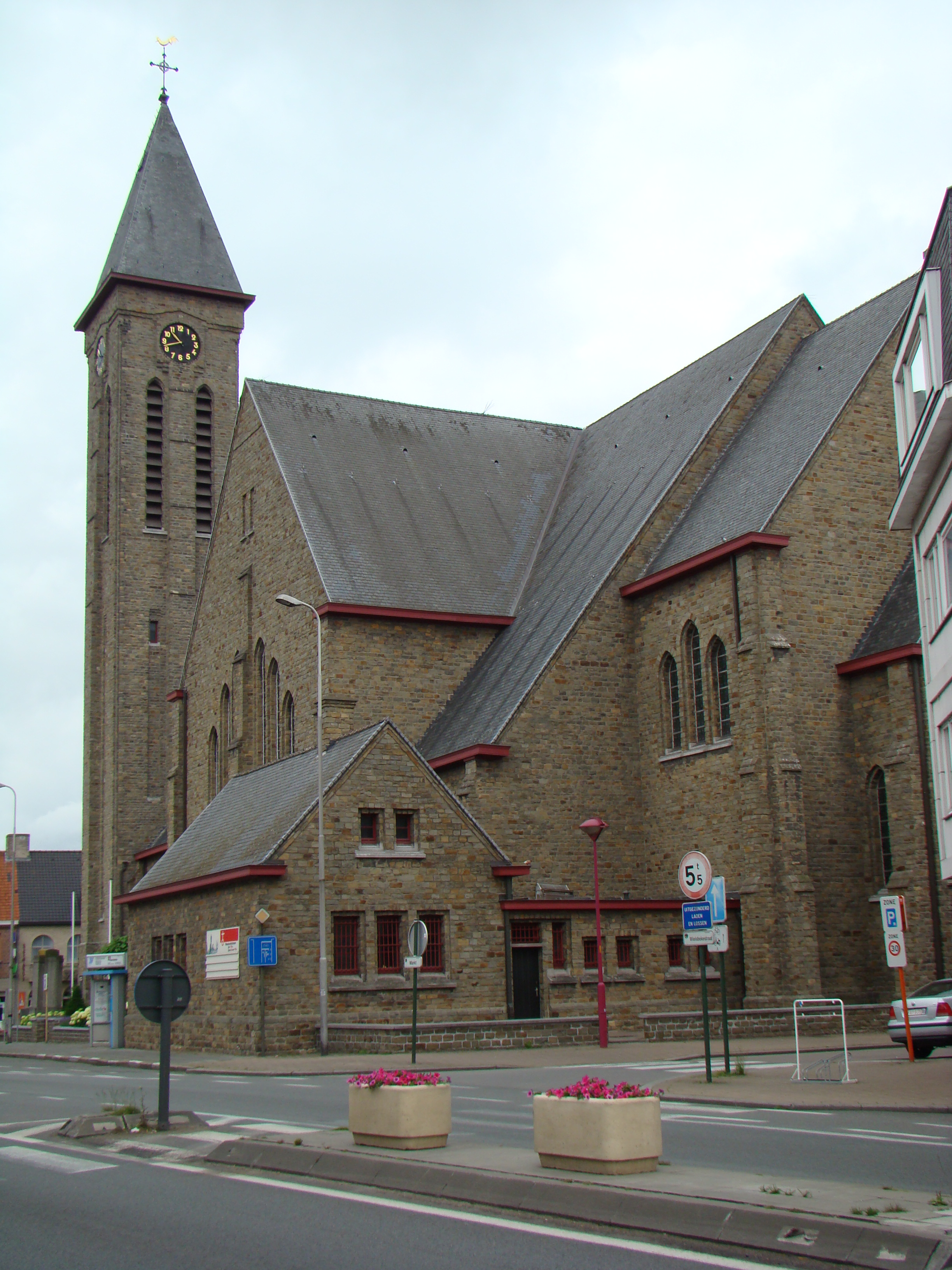
Saint-Amanduschurch
