= Lys (river) =

River in France and Belgium

Lys/Leie
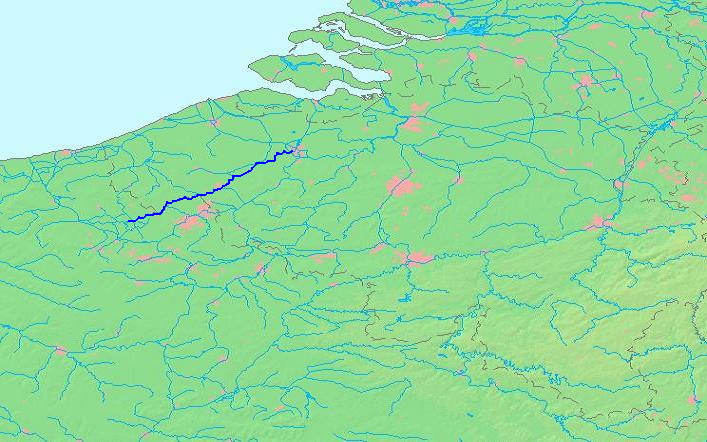
- The course of the Lys

- Location within France Location within Belgium

Location
- Country: France, Belgium

Physical characteristics
- Source
  - location: Pas-de-Calais
  - elevation: 115 m (377 ft)
- Mouth
  - location: Scheldt
  - coordinates: 51°3′18″N 3°44′3″E
- Length: 202 km (126 mi)

Basin features
- Progression: Scheldt→ North Sea

The Lys (French pronunciation: [lis]) or Leie (Dutch pronunciation: [ˈlɛiə]) is a river in France and Belgium, and a left-bank tributary of the Scheldt. Its source is in Pas-de-Calais, France, and it flows into the river Scheldt, with the confluence in the city of Ghent, Belgium. Its total length is 202 kilometres (126 mi).

Historically a very polluted river from the high population density and industrialisation in both Northern France and Belgium, it has seen substantial improvements in recent years, partly due to the decline of the principal industry, the spinning and weaving of flax. The region of the Leie (between Deinze and Ghent) was known as a favourite place for numerous painters in the first half of the 20th century.

The source of the Lys is in a village, Lisbourg, east of Fruges, in the Pas-de-Calais department of France. It flows generally northeast through the following departments of France, provinces of Belgium and towns and municipalities:

- Pas-de-Calais (F): Thérouanne, Aire-sur-la-Lys
- Nord (F): Merville, Armentières, Halluin
- Hainaut (B): Comines-Warneton
- West Flanders (B): Menen, Wevelgem, Kortrijk, Waregem, Wervik
- East Flanders (B): Zulte, Deinze, Ghent

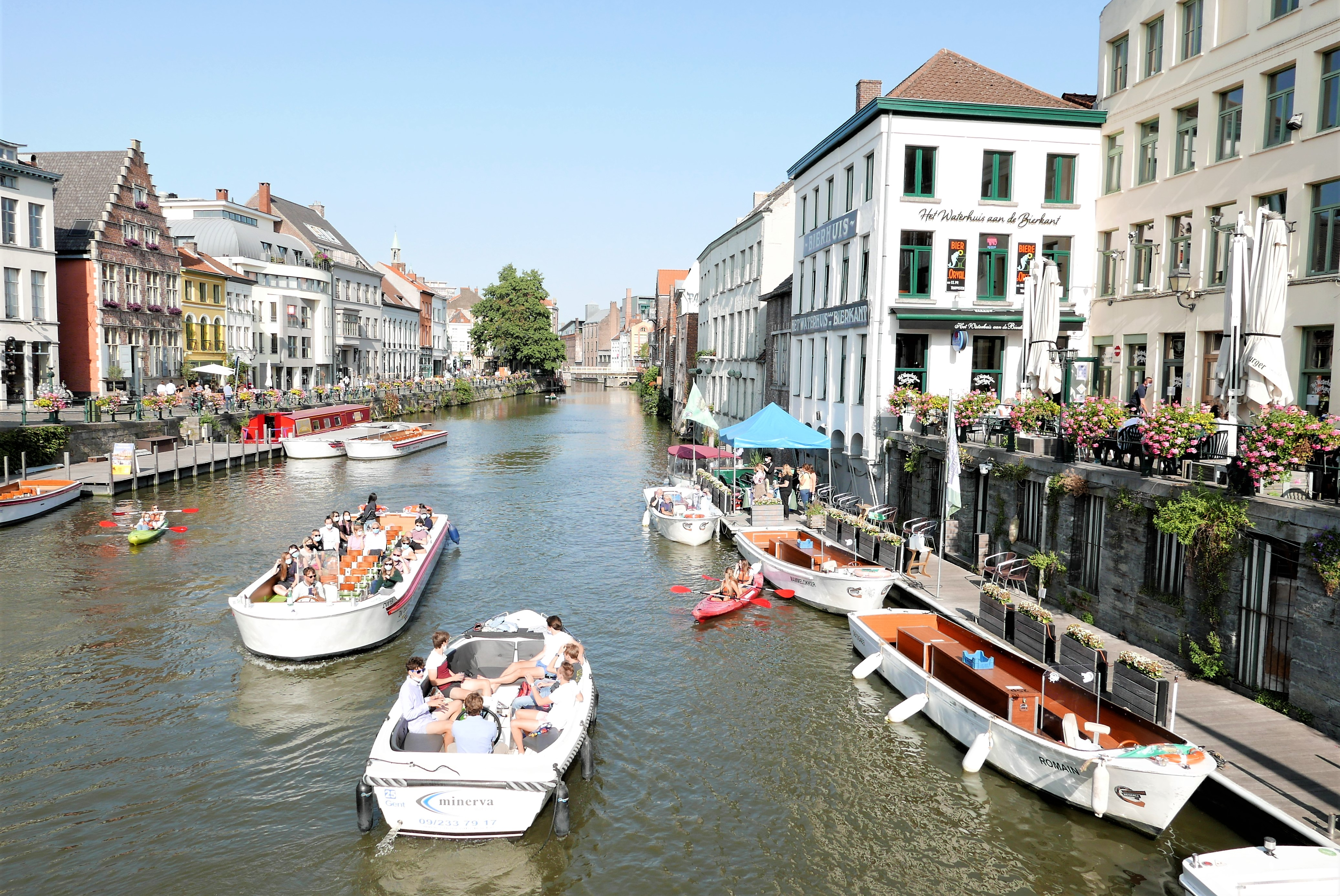
The river in Ghent

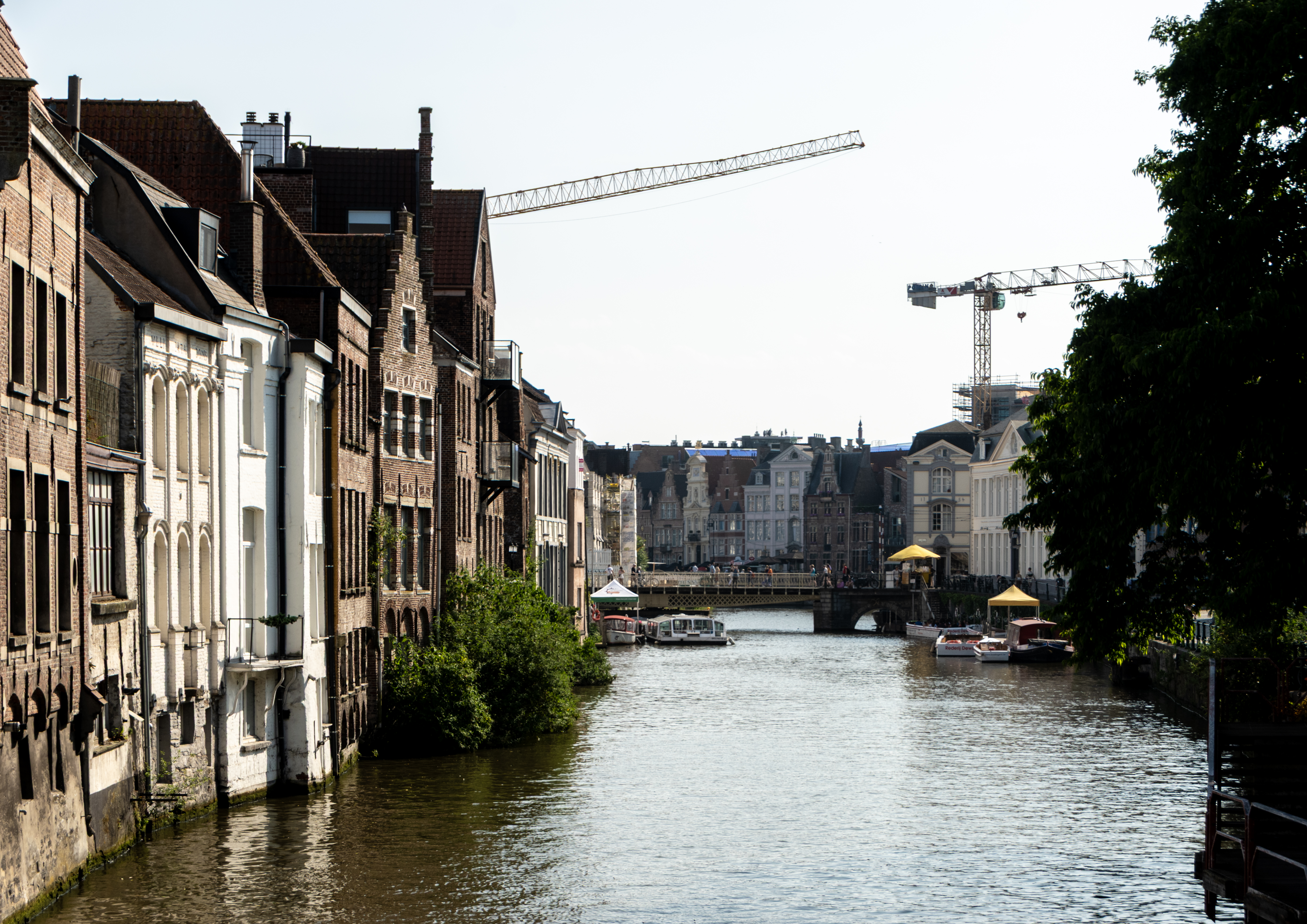
Buildings south along the Leie in Ghent

The main tributaries of the Leie are, from source to mouth: Laquette, Clarence, Lawe, Deûle, Gaverbeek, Heulebeek, and Mandel.

The river was the location of three battles between the Allies and the German Army during the two world wars. During the First World War in 1918 the location was the scene of the First Battle of the Lys, which was part of the German Spring Offensive and later that year of the Second Battle of the Lys, which was part of the Allies' Hundred Days Offensive. During the Second World War, the Battle of the Lys (1940) was part of the Nazi German Wehrmacht's Blitzkrieg offensive towards the English Channel.

== History ==
The Leie/Lys was a commercial navigation from the Middle Ages, but it was the river's devastating floods rather than navigation improvements which justified major works and meander cut-offs started around 1670. The 9 meter difference in elevation between Aire-sur-la-Lys and the border was gradually overcome by six locks and weirs, completed in 1780. The river carried a heavy traffic in grain and linen through to Ghent and Antwerp. The navigation was leased out to a company around 1825, and the locks upgraded to 5.20 m wide, for a draught of 1.60 m. In December 1899, more than 40 schoolchildren skating on the frozen river at Frelinghien fell through the ice and drowned.

The river was given its present depth by the Freycinet programme. The section below Armentières was enlarged to class III from 1930, and the border section was improved to class Va starting from 1960. This section is part of the EU's priority project 30 for the Seine-Escaut waterway. The upstream section, by contrast, is used almost exclusively by recreational craft, and is at present heavily silted.
