= List of candidates in the 2014 European Parliament election in Belgium =

This is a list of all the candidates in the Belgian European Parliament election, held in 2014.

== European Parliament ==
Seat distribution per party	After the 2009 election	After the 2014 election
CD&V	3 / 22	2 / 21
OPEN VLD	3 / 22	3 / 21
PS	3 / 22	3 / 21
VLAAMS BELANG	2 / 22	1 / 21
MR	2 / 22	3 / 21
SP.A	2 / 22	1 / 21
ECOLO	2 / 22	1 / 21
CDH	2 / 22	1 / 21
N-VA	1 / 22	4 / 21
GROEN	1 / 22	1 / 21
LDD	1 / 22	0 / 21
CSP	1 / 22	1 / 21

=== Electoral colleges ===
==== Dutch-speaking (12 seats) ====
Major parties:

	CD&V	2 (–1)	Marianne Thyssen
	Candidate	Votes	
1.	Marianne Thyssen		
2.	Ivo Belet		
3.	Steven Vanackere		
4.	Marie De Clerck		
5.	Piet Buyse		
6.	Elke Tindemans		
7.	Mustafa Uzun		
8.	Annick Sevenans		
9.	Jan de Keyser		
10.	An Hermans		
11.	Eddy Couckuyt		
12.	Geertrui Van Rompuy-Windels		
(1)	Tom Vandenkendelaere		
(2)	Marilyn Neven		
(3)	Lucas Van Dessel		
(4)	Sofie Landuyt		
(5)	Ludwig Caluwé		
(6)	Christina Van Geel		
(7)	Paul Breyne		

	GROEN	1 (=0)	Bart Staes
	Candidate	Votes	
1.	Bart Staes		
2.	Petra De Sutter		
3.	Björn Siffer		
4.	Malika Abbad		
5.	Sammy Roelant		
6.	Ikrame Kastit		
7.	Dirk Vansintjan		
8.	Francine De Prins		
9.	Hugo Van Dienderen		
10.	Stella Nyanchama Okemwa		
11.	Collins Nweke		
12.	Anne Provoost		
(1)	Dirk Holemans		
(2)	Eline Deblaere		
(3)	Frank Vroonen		
(4)	Eva Platteau		
(5)	Philippe Avijn		
(6)	Fran Bambust		
(7)	Astrid Wittebolle		

	N-VA	4 (+3)	Johan Van Overtveldt
	Candidate	Votes	
1.	Johan Van Overtveldt		
2.	Helga Stevens		
3.	Mark Demesmaker		
4.	Louis Ide		
5.	Miet Vandersteegen		
6.	Jan Moons		
7.	Clémence Maes		
8.	Mieke Van Hootegem		
9.	Simonne Janssens-Vanoppen		
10.	Nabilla Ait Daoud		
11.	Matthias Storme		
12.	Marc Descheemaecker		
(1)	Sander Loones		
(2)	Anneleen Van Bossuyt		
(3)	Ralph Packet		
(4)	Ann‐Sofie Van Den Broeck		
(5)	Veerle Stassijns		
(6)	Laurent Mutambayi		
(7)	Flor Van Noppen		

	OPEN VLD	3 (=0)	Guy Verhofstadt
	Candidate	Votes	
1.	Guy Verhofstadt		
2.	Annemie Neyts		
3.	Karlos Callens		
4.	Eva De Bleeker		
5.	Georges Lenssen		
6.	Brieuc Van Damme		
7.	Katrien Brosens		
8.	Stijn Vandersmissen		
9.	Martine Mertens		
10.	Jacinta De Roeck		
11.	Greet Geypen		
12.	Karel De Gucht		
(1)	Philippe De Backer		
(2)	Hilde Vautmans		
(3)	Lieve Wierinck		
(4)	Moniek Gheysens		
(5)	Bram Vanderborght		
(6)	Pedro Brugada Terradellas		
(7)	Jan Terlouw		

	SP.A	1 (–1)	Kathleen Van Brempt
	Candidate	Votes	
1.	Kathleen Van Brempt		
2.	Saïd El Khadraoui		
3.	Valerie Del Re		
4.	Tom Balthazar		
5.	Sanne Doms		
6.	Matthias Somers		
7.	Samira Mayda		
8.	Hasan Bilici		
9.	Vera Drozdik		
10.	Lieven Meert		
11.	Francy Van Der Wildt		
12.	Eddy Van Lancker		
(1)	Nick Mouton		
(2)	Jutta Buyse		
(3)	Pieter Vandenbroucke		
(4)	Emilie Peeters		
(5)	Kris Verduyckt		
(6)	Patricia Lamas Sanchez		
(7)	Yasin Kilic		

	VLAAMS BELANG	1 (–1)	Gerolf Annemans
	Candidate	Votes	
1.	Gerolf Annemans		
2.	Rita De Bont		
3.	Filip De Man		
4.	Mariëtte Voogd		
5.	Frans Wymeersch		
6.	Marleen Fannes		
7.	Paul Meeus		
8.	Wis Versyp		
9.	Pieter Van Boxel		
10.	Mercedes Armirotto		
11.	Reddy De Mey		
12.	Karolien Dewinter		
(1)	Sam Van Rooy		
(2)	Ellen Samyn		
(3)	Rien Vandenberghe		
(4)	Nadine Motten		
(5)	Josée Van den Nieuwenhof		
(6)	Hilde De Lobel		
(7)	Luk Van Nieuwenhuysen		

Minor parties:

	PTB/PVDA+	0 (=0)	Tim Joye
	Candidate	Votes	
1.	Tim Joye		
2.	Lydie Neufcourt		
3.	Tony Fonteyne		
4.	Diane Vangeneugden		
5.	Mohamed Ali		
6.	Letizia Puzzello		
7.	Raf Jespers		
8.	Lieve Peeters		
9.	Thomas Weyts (SAP)		
10.	Angel Weetjens		
11.	Heidi Walgraeve		
12.	Han Soete		
(1)	Jo Cottenier		
(2)	Riet Verspreet		
(3)	Olivier Winants		
(4)	Mieke Van De Ven		
(5)	Peter Degand		
(6)	Lucie Van Crombrugge		
(7)	Johan Hoebeke		

==== French-speaking (8 seats) ====
Major parties:

	CDH	1 (=0)	Claude Rolin
	Candidate	Votes	
1.	Claude Rolin		
2.	Ann Cloet-Faingaert		
3.	Mathieu Morelle		
4.	Anne‐Marie Claeys-Matthys		
5.	Alain Maingain		
6.	Christiane Collinet-Guissart		
7.	Monique Misenga Kasongo		
8.	René Thissen		
(1)	Antoine Tanzilli		
(2)	Nayyha Aynaou		
(3)	Cevdet Yildiz		
(4)	Martine Coquelet		
(5)	Clotilde Nyssens		
(6)	Jean‐Pierre Grafé		

	ECOLO	1 (–1)	Philippe Lamberts
	Candidate	Votes	
1.	Philippe Lamberts		
2.	Saskia Bricmont		
3.	Christian Noiret		
4.	Sandra Jen		
5.	Pierre Scieur		
6.	Sabine Toussaint		
7.	Michel Bourlet		
8.	Thérèse Snoy		
(1)	Caroline Saal		
(2)	Hajib El Hajjaji		
(3)	Catherine Marneffe		
(4)	Bernard Convié		
(5)	Anne Depuydt		
(6)	Jean‐Marie Constant		

	MR	3 (+1)	Louis Michel
	Candidate	Votes	
1.	Louis Michel		
2.	Frédérique Ries		
3.	Gérard Deprez		
4.	Latifa Aït-Baala		
5.	Maxime Daye		
6.	Belma Tek		
7.	Marie‐Christine Pironnet		
8.	Benoît Cassart		
(1)	René Ladouce		
(2)	Carine Gol-Lescot		
(3)	Bertrand Lespagnard		
(4)	Françoise Parent		
(5)	Julie Rizkallah-Szmaj		
(6)	Pierre Hazette		

	PS	3 (=0)	Marie Arena
	Candidate	Votes	
1.	Marie Arena		
2.	Marc Tarabella		
3.	Hugues Bayet		
4.	Clio Brzakala		
5.	Louison Renault		
6.	Carine Delfanne		
7.	Julienne Mpemba		
8.	Amaury Caprasse		
(1)	Franco Seminara		
(2)	Faouzia Hariche		
(3)	Daniel Van Daele		
(4)	Duygu Celik		
(5)	Céline Meersman		
(6)	Michel Jadot		

Minor parties:

	FDF	0 (=0)	Cristina Coteanu
	Candidate	Votes	
1.	Cristina Coteanu		
2.	Michel Carlier		
3.	Nathalie Leclaire		
4.	Fabrice Fernandez Pilurzi		
5.	Florella Adobati		
6.	Quentin Van Gansberghe		
7.	Sandra Ferretti		
8.	Enio Cucurachi		
(1)	Paul Cartuyvels		
(2)	Martine Spitaels		
(3)	Christophe T'Sas		
(4)	Satguine Maison		
(5)	Jean‐Marie Lognoul		
(6)	Françoise Carton de Wiart		

	PP	0 (=0)	Luc Trullemans
	Candidate	Votes	
1.	Luc Trullemans		
2.	Patricia Petrons		
3.	Daniel Dailly		
4.	Béatrice De Smet		
5.	Antonia Pau		
6.	Modesto Chao Fernandez		
7.	Christine Dalle Mule-Redote		
8.	Francis Cole		
(1)	Michel Mary		
(2)	Lourdes Chao Mallilos Carreras		
(3)	Fabrizio Palmeri		
(4)	Johanna Zalenska		
(5)	Martine Gerber		
(6)	Jacques Weimann		

	MG	0 (=0)	Eulalia Damaso
	Candidate	Votes	
1.	Eulalia Damaso		
2.	Alin Godin		
3.	Brigitte Grafé		
4.	Michel Marique		
5.	Annie Lambillotte		
6.	Dirk Pauwels		
7.	Anna Lella		
8.	Emmanuel Emonts		
(1)	Jean‐Pierre Keimeul		
(2)	Aurore Chevalier		
(3)	Freddy Pieters		
(4)	Emily Joseph		
(5)	Gérard Gillard		
(6)	Agnès Abels		

	PTB/PVDA–GO!	0 (=0)	Aurélie Decoene
	Candidate	Votes	
1.	Aurélie Decoene		
2.	Christian Panier		
3.	François D'Agostino (PC)		
4.	Céline Caudron (LCR)		
5.	Incoronata Baldassarre		
6.	Ghislain Mignon		
7.	Sofia Grigorean		
8.	Marco Antonio De Lera Garcia		
(1)	David Pestieau		
(2)	Lizz Printz		
(3)	Dino Cala		
(4)	Yasmina Messaoudi		
(5)	Alain Caufriez		
(6)	Léa Tuna		

	STAND UP USE	0 (=0)	Sophie Heine
	Candidate	Votes	
1.	Sophie Heine		
2.	Pietro De Matteis		
3.	Alia Cardyn		
4.	Benjamin Goodman		
5.	Roberto Mongiovi		
6.	Marine Planquart		
7.	An‐Marie Vandromme		
8.	Mathias Maertens		
(1)	François Denuit		
(2)	Lauranne Devillé		
(3)	Quentin De Le Vingne		
(4)	Elise Hap		
(5)	Olga Zouboff		
(6)	Florian Etienne		

	VEGA	0 (=0)	Vincent Decroly
	Candidate	Votes	
1.	Vincent Decroly		
2.	Stéphanie Grisard		
3.	Thierry Bingen		
4.	Delia Delcour		
5.	Fabian Dortu		
6.	Marie‐Claire Hames		
7.	Didier Brissa		
8.	Gwenaëlle Martin		
(1)	Santo Dolce		
(2)	Aurélie Vandeputte		
(3)	Pierre Ergo		
(4)	Bouchra Laraki		
(5)	Adrien Rosman		
(6)	Karine Passelecq		

==== German-speaking (1 seat) ====
Major parties:

	CSP	1 (=0)	Pascal Arimont
	Candidate	Votes	
1.	Pascal Arimont		
(1)	Patricia Creutz-Vilvoye		
(2)	Daniel Franzen		
(3)	Fabienne Xhonneux		
(4)	Bernd Karthäuser		
(5)	Marion Dhur		
(6)	Luc Frank		

Minor parties:

	ECOLO	0 (=0)	Erwin Schöpges
	Candidate	Votes	
1.	Erwin Schöpges		
(1)	Monika Dethier-Neumann		
(2)	Tom Rosenstein		
(3)	Elvira Hostert-Heyen		
(4)	Arnold François		
(5)	Uli Deller		
(6)	Marlene Bongartz-Kaut		

	PFF	0 (=0)	Axel Kittel
	Candidate	Votes	
1.	Axel Kittel		
(1)	Patrick Thevisssen		
(2)	Stephanie Schiffer		
(3)	Susanne Scheepers		
(4)	André Britz		
(5)	Cécile Pfeiffer		
(6)	Gregor Freches		

	PRO DG	0 (=0)	Lydia Klinkenberg
	Candidate	Votes	
1.	Lydia Klinkenberg		
(1)	Lothar Hanf		
(2)	Dorothea Peters		
(3)	Monika Hunds		
(4)	Patrick Wiesemes		
(5)	Elke Comoth		
(6)	Alain Kever		

	SP	0 (=0)	Antonios Antoniadis
	Candidate	Votes	
1.	Antonios Antoniadis		
(1)	Resi Stoffels		
(2)	Matthias Zimmermann		
(3)	Sandra Schrauben		
(4)	Oliver Jacobs		
(5)	Josiane Michiels		
(6)	Johann Klos		

	VIVANT	0 (=0)	Andreas Meyer
	Candidate	Votes	
1.	Andreas Meyer		
(1)	Michael Balter		
(2)	Ursula Wiesemes		
(3)	Alain Mertes		
(4)	Christel Meyer		
(5)	Tony Brusselmans		
(6)	Linda Nix		
