= LGBTQ rights in Belgium =

- Location of Belgium (dark green) – in Europe (light green & dark grey) – in the European Union (light green) – [Legend]
- Legal status: Legal since 1795, age of consent (re)equalized in 1985
- Gender identity: Transgender persons allowed to change legal gender without surgery
- Military: LGBTQ people allowed to serve openly
- Discrimination protections: Sexual orientation and gender identity protections (see below)

Family rights
- Recognition of relationships: Statutory cohabitation since 2000; Same-sex marriage since 2003
- Adoption: Full adoption rights since 2006

Lesbian, gay, bisexual, transgender, and queer (LGBTQ) rights in Belgium are regarded as some of the most progressive in Europe and the world. In 2023, ILGA-Europe ranked Belgium as second in the European Union for LGBTQ rights protection, behind Malta. In 2024, ILGA-Europe ranked Belgium the third highest after Malta and Iceland.

Same-sex sexual activity was legalised in 1795, with an equal age of consent, and with a slightly older age of consent from 1965 until 1985. After granting same-sex couples domestic partnership benefits in 2000, Belgium became the second country in the world to legalise same-sex marriage in 2003. Same-sex adoption was fully legalised in 2006 under the same terms and conditions as heterosexual adoption, and lesbian couples can access IVF as well. Protections from discrimination based on sexual orientation in employment, housing, and public and private accommodations were enacted in 2003 and on gender identity and expression in 2014. Transgender people have been allowed to change their legal gender since 2007, though under certain restrictions which were repealed in 2018. Additionally, conversion therapy was banned in 2023.

Belgium has frequently been referred to as one of the most gay-friendly countries in the world, with recent polls indicating that a majority of Belgians support same-sex marriage and adoption rights. The previous Prime Minister of Belgium, Elio Di Rupo, is an openly gay man, and was one of the few heads of government in the world to openly identify as LGBTQ. Pascal Smet, the former Flemish Minister of Education and Brussels Minister of Mobility, is also openly gay. With the appointment of Petra De Sutter as Minister of Civil Service in 2020, Belgium is one of the first countries in the world to have an openly transgender woman as a government minister.

== Law regarding same-sex sexual activity ==
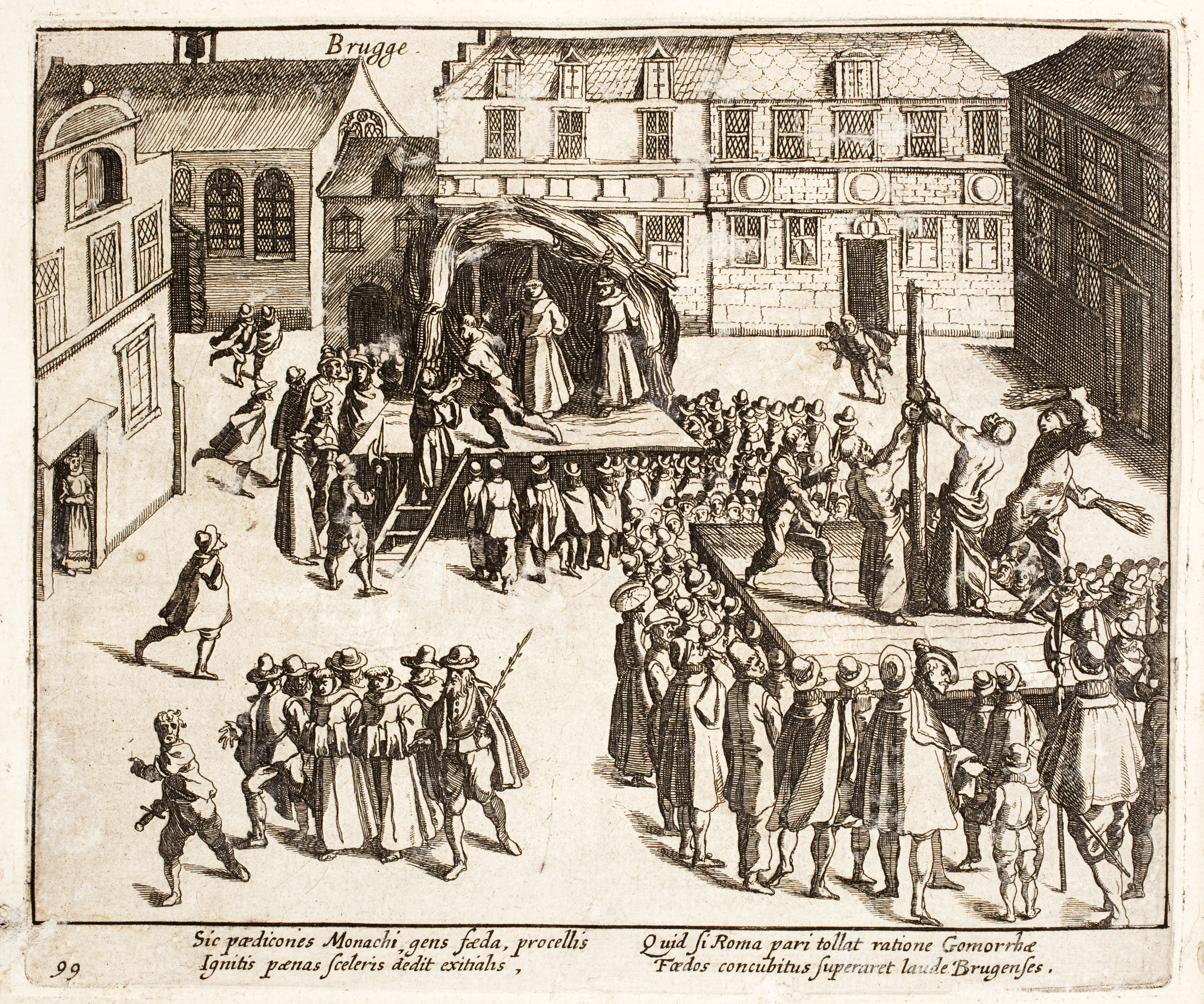
16th-century illustration of the execution of five Franciscan friars through fire and torture for sodomy in Bruges, 26 July 1578

Prior to 1795, the modern borders of the Kingdom of Belgium existed mostly within the Holy Roman Empire and was divided between the Austrian Netherlands, the Duchy of Bouillon, and the Prince-Bishopric of Liège, along with the Kingdom of France and the Republic of the Seven United Netherlands. In the Medieval and Early Modern Belgium 'sodomy' was disproportionately persecuted relative to the rest of Europe at the same time. The majority of those tried for 'sodomy' in the period were killed at the stake.

Same-sex sexual activity has been legal since 1795, when the country was a French possession. Article 372 of the Penal Code sets the age of consent to 16, regardless of sexual orientation and/or gender. This was briefly increased to 18 for same-sex sexual activity between 1965 and 1985 by the addition and later repeal of article 372bis to the Penal Code. It was inserted by an amendment of MP Freddy Terwagne to the law of 8 April 1965 on youth protection. In the 1980s, the case Eliane Morissens (a lesbian teacher who had suffered employment discrimination) sparked a debate on institutional homophobia, which resulted in the Flemish Socialist Party declaring its support for an equal age of consent. In June 1982, a law repealing article 372bis was submitted by MP Luc Van den Bossche. The law was approved by the Chamber of Representatives on 13 May 1983, and by the Senate in June 1985. It was enacted on 18 June 1985.

== Recognition of same-sex relationships ==
Belgium became the second country to allow same-sex marriages in 2003 (after the Netherlands). Same-sex couples have the same legal rights as opposite-sex couples.

The Flemish bishops of the Belgian bishops conference published on 20 September 2022 a liturgical document for the blessing of same-sex unions.

== Adoption and family planning ==
Same-sex couples have had the same rights as opposite-sex couples in adopting children since 2006. Additionally, lesbian couples can access in vitro fertilisation.

A legal inequality compared to heterosexual couples existed until 2015 with regards to children: the husband of the biological mother was automatically legally recognised as the father (by article 135 of the Civil Code), but this was not the case in a same-sex couple for the wife of the mother. To be recognised as the co-mother, she had to complete an adoption procedure. This accounted for the large majority of adoption cases in Belgium. The Di Rupo Government promised to fix this, and in 2014, as the Netherlands recently passed similar legislation, LGBT organisations pressured the government about their promise. Subsequently, legislators worked to agree on a solution. A bill fixing this inequality was approved by the Senate on 3 April 2014 on a 48–2 vote (with one abstention), and by the Chamber of Representatives on 23 April on a 114–10 vote (with one abstention). The bill received royal assent on 5 May and went into effect on 1 January 2015.

Generally, adoption law is regulated at the federal level, whereas the adoption procedure is managed by the community governments. Between 2006 and 2014, 56 male same-sex couples and two female same-sex couples had domestically adopted a child in the Flemish Community (Flanders). In the same period, 12 children were domestically adopted in the French Community, giving a total of 70 LGBT domestic adoptions in Belgium in that period.

== Discrimination protections and hate crimes ==
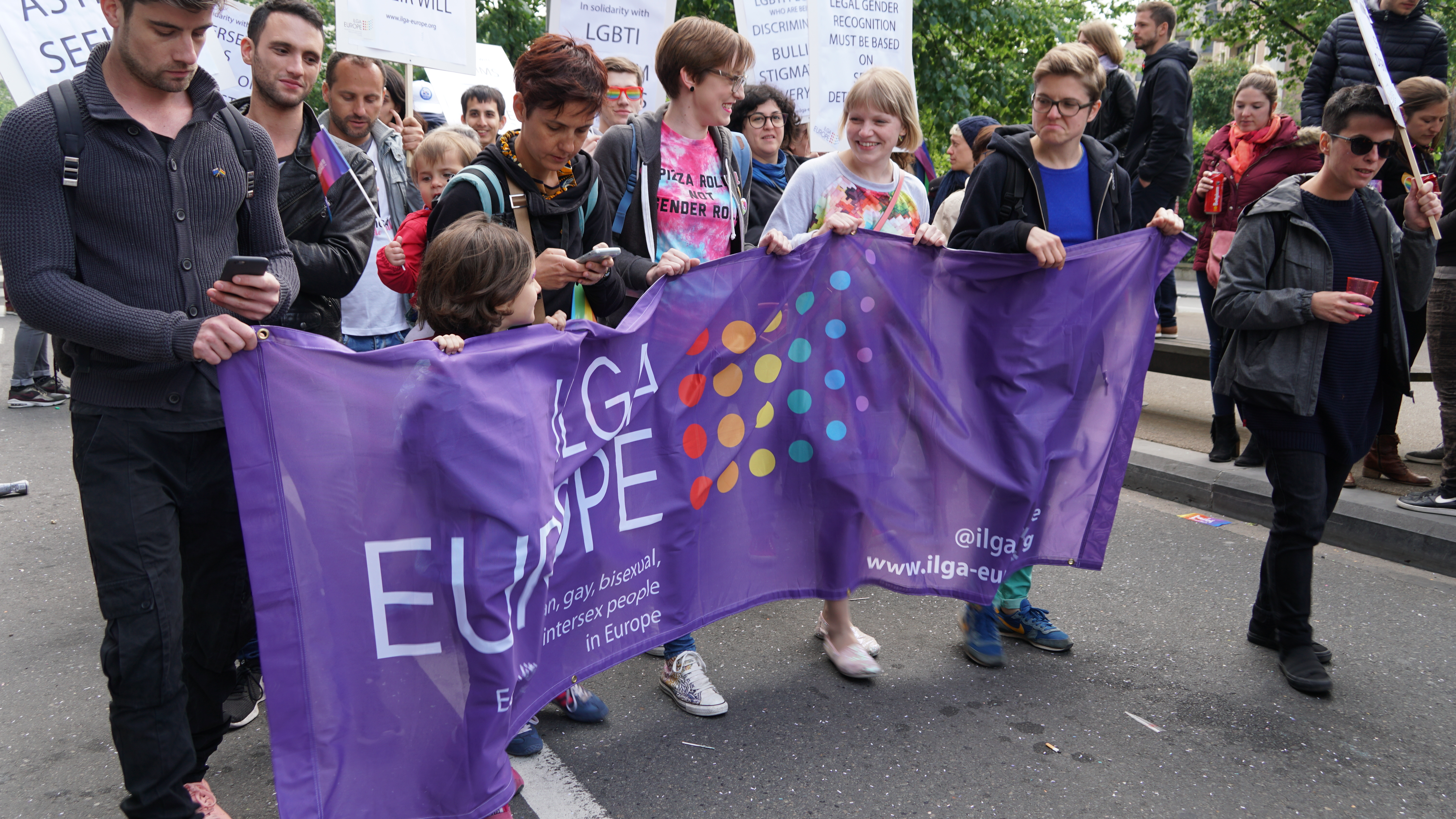
ILGA-Europe at the 2018 Belgian Pride parade, Brussels

The anti-discrimination law of 25 February 2003 included discrimination protections on the basis of sex and sexual orientation. The law was replaced by a similar law in 2007, known as the Anti Discrimination Law 2007 (Dutch: Wet ter bestrijding van bepaalde vormen van discriminatie; French: Loi tendant à lutter contre certaines formes de discrimination; German: Gesetz zur Bekämpfung bestimmter Formen von Diskriminierung). The 2003 and 2007 anti-discrimination laws also establish penalty enhancements for crimes motivated by hate on the basis of, among others, sex and sexual orientation.

On 29 November 2013, the Federal Government approved an expansion of the anti-discrimination law to include gender identity and gender expression. It was approved by the Federal Parliament and received royal assent on 22 May 2014.

On 22 December 2014, the jury of the court of assizes of Liège found four people guilty of the murder of Ihsane Jarfi, motivated by homophobia. It was the first case in Belgium in which a crime was officially qualified as being motivated by hate on the basis of sexual orientation.

In May 2018, the Centre for Equal Opportunities and Opposition to Racism reported it had processed 125 cases of homophobic discrimination in 2018, a 38% increase over the past five years. This included 17 physical attacks, 42 public homophobic insults, 17 housing discrimination cases, and 31 online attacks. A study, published in May 2019 and commissioned by Secretary of State for Equal Opportunities Bianca Debaets, found that 90% of LGBT people in Brussels had been the victim of verbal or psychological harassment, with a third stating that they had been physically assaulted.

== Conversion therapy practices ==
On 20 July 2023, Parliament approved a law that bans conversion practices, defined as "any practice consisting of or including physical intervention or the application of psychological pressure, which the perpetrator or victim believes or claims is intended to repress or to alter a person's sexual orientation, gender identity or gender expression, whether that characteristic is actually present or merely assumed by the perpetrator." Punishment range from imprisonment of 8 days to 2 years and/or a fine of 208 to 2400 euros, and a professional ban up to 5 years.

== Transgender rights ==
Countries in Europe allowing gender self-identification

The Law of 10 May 2007 on transsexuality (Dutch: Wet van 10 mei 2007 betreffende de transseksualiteit; French: Loi du 10 mai 2007 relative à la transsexualité; German: Gesetz vom 10. Mai 2007 über die Transsexualität) grants Belgians the right to change their legal gender. Prior to this, a gender change was only possible through a court judgment. Between 2002 and 2012, there was a yearly average of 31 men and 14 women who officially changed their legal gender, with an increase after the 2007 law came into in effect. Conditions included that the person has a "constant and irreversible inner conviction to belong to the sex opposite to that mentioned in the birth certificate" and that "the physical body is adapted to the opposite sex as far as possible and justified from a medical point of view", meaning applicants were required to undergo sterilisation and sex reassignment surgery.

Plans to amend the law to remove these requirements were announced by the Michel Government in 2015, passed by the Chamber of Representatives (and signed by King Philippe) in 2017, and took effect on 1 January 2018. Shortly after the law took effect in January 2018, LGBT rights organisations challenged it before the Constitutional Court of Belgium, arguing that the binary choice (male or female) and the ability of changing one's sex only once remain discriminatory. In June 2019, the Constitutional Court ruled that the law is unconstitutional and must therefore be amended. Currently, it is only possible to change gender on the identity card from male to female or vice versa, but according to the court, persons who are non-binary are excluded from this rule. The court held that an "X" sex option should be available. The Constitutional Court has asked the Belgian Federal Parliament to work on an arrangement that complies with the ruling, whether through the "creation of one or more additional categories" or the removal of gender from compulsory registration. The De Croo Government has agreed to amend the current law. Their 2020 coalition agreement states that "legislation will be amended in accordance with the ruling of the Constitutional Court. The further implications of that will be investigated."

To change legal sex, adults have to file an application with a statement that their legal sex does not correspond with their gender identity. No surgery or other medical or psychological treatment or opinion is required. After filing an application, the government informs the applying person about the legal consequences of a requested change. The applicant has to renew their intent to have their legal sex changed within three months of application and to declare that they are aware of the legal consequences of a change. Minors between 12 and 16 have the possibility to change their first name, but not sex. Minors aged 16 and 17 have the possibility to apply for a sex change with parental consent and a psychological opinion confirming that their decision has been taken freely and without any outside pressure.

According to the National Register, 727 transgender Belgians changed their legal gender under the new law in 2018.

Many Belgian hospitals, the Ghent University Hospital (UZ Gent) among them, are known for their specialisation in sex reassignment surgery. Many French transgender people go there due to a lack of accepting hospitals in France.

== Intersex rights ==
Intersex infants in Belgium may undergo medical interventions to have their sex characteristics altered. Human rights groups increasingly consider these surgeries unnecessary and, they argue, should only be performed if the applicant consents to the operation. In February 2019, the UN Committee on the Rights of the Child recommended Belgium to ban these surgeries and provide intersex infants and their parents counseling and support.

The first intersex organization in Flanders, Intersekse Vlaanderen, was officially registered in August 2019.

== Military service ==
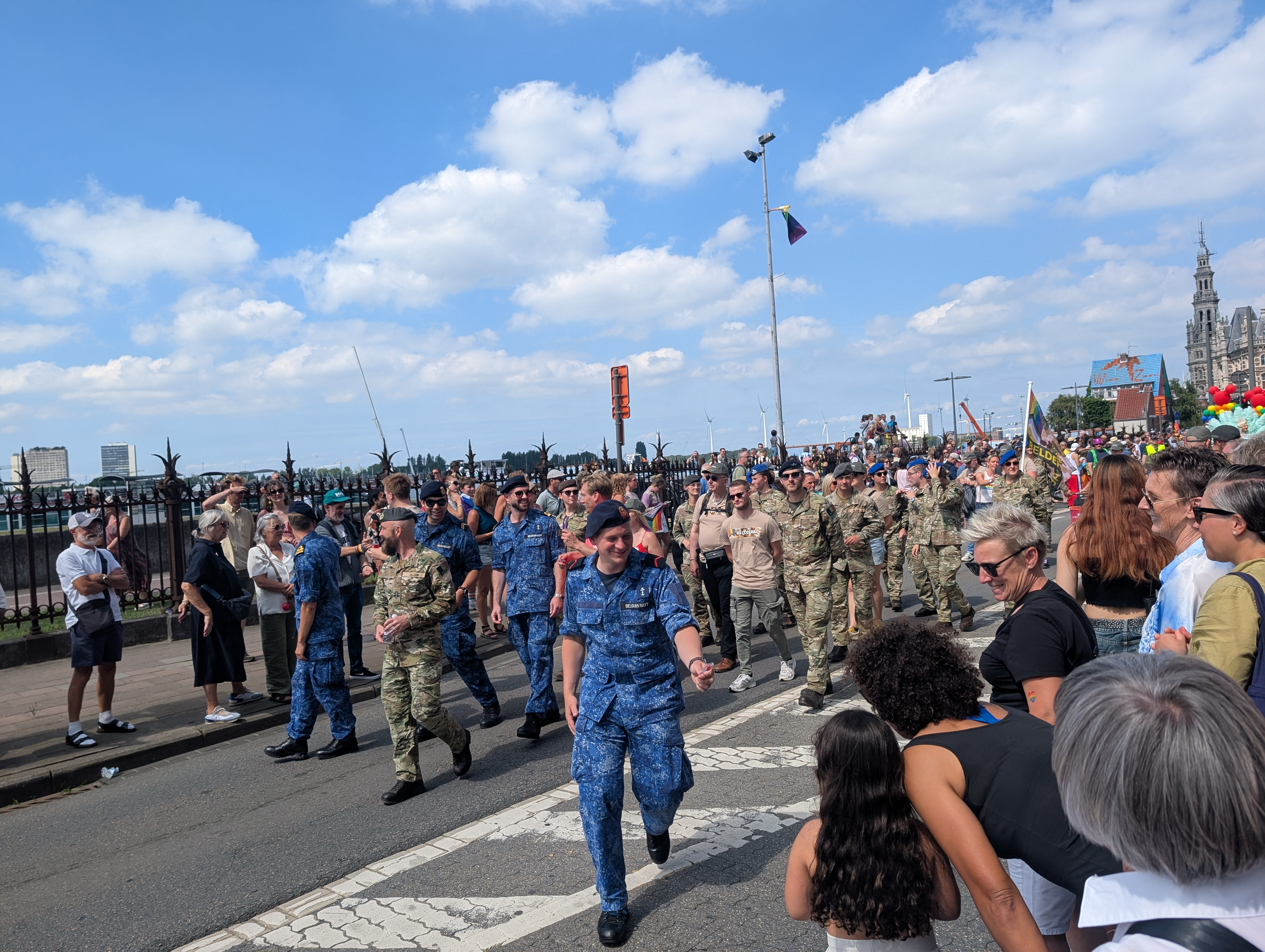
The Belgian Defence Rainbow Community at the Antwerp Pride 2025

LGBT people are free to serve openly in the Belgian Armed Forces.

The Belgian Defence Rainbow Community or BELDEFRAC is an association of LGBTQIA+ people employed in the Belgian Armed Forces.

== Health and blood donation ==
In Belgium, as in many other countries, men who have sex with men (MSM) were previously not allowed to donate blood. In 2017, the blanket ban was repealed and replaced with a one-year deferral period. In 2016, Health Minister Maggie De Block promised to re-evaluate the law using the newest scientific discoveries. In November 2016, she announced the ban would be amended in 2017, making it possible for gay and bisexual men to donate blood after a year of abstinence from sex. Regulations to this effect were approved on 28 April 2017 by the Council of Ministers. On 1 July 2023, the deferral period was shortened to 4 months.

In June 2019, the Flemish Red Cross announced it was banning transgender people from donating blood in Flanders. Following consultations with health and LGBT groups, it reversed course and lifted the ban on 30 September 2019. Transgender people can donate subject to a three-month deferral period after starting hormonal therapy and a 4-month deferral period after having sex with a new partner or a 12-month deferral after the last sexual encounter with people considered to be of high-risk of having STDs, such as swingers and MSM.

In 2019, LGBT groups, financed by the Flemish Ministry of Health, launched an LGBT suicide prevention project called lumi.be, and a specific transgender suicide prevention website called gendervonk.be.

== Living conditions ==
LGBT people are generally socially accepted in Belgium. There is a strong gay community, with numerous gay clubs, bars, venues and events. A 2006 European Union member poll showed that 62% of Belgians supported the legalisation of same-sex marriage in the whole of Europe. The 2015 Eurobarometer found that 77% of Belgians thought that same-sex marriage should be allowed throughout Europe, 20% were against.

The 2019 Eurobarometer showed that 84% of Belgians believed gay and bisexual people should enjoy the same rights as heterosexual people, and 82% supported same-sex marriage. The 2023 Eurobarometer found that 79% of Belgians thought same-sex marriage should be allowed throughout Europe, and 80% agreed that "there is nothing wrong in a sexual relationship between two persons of the same sex".

=== Politics ===
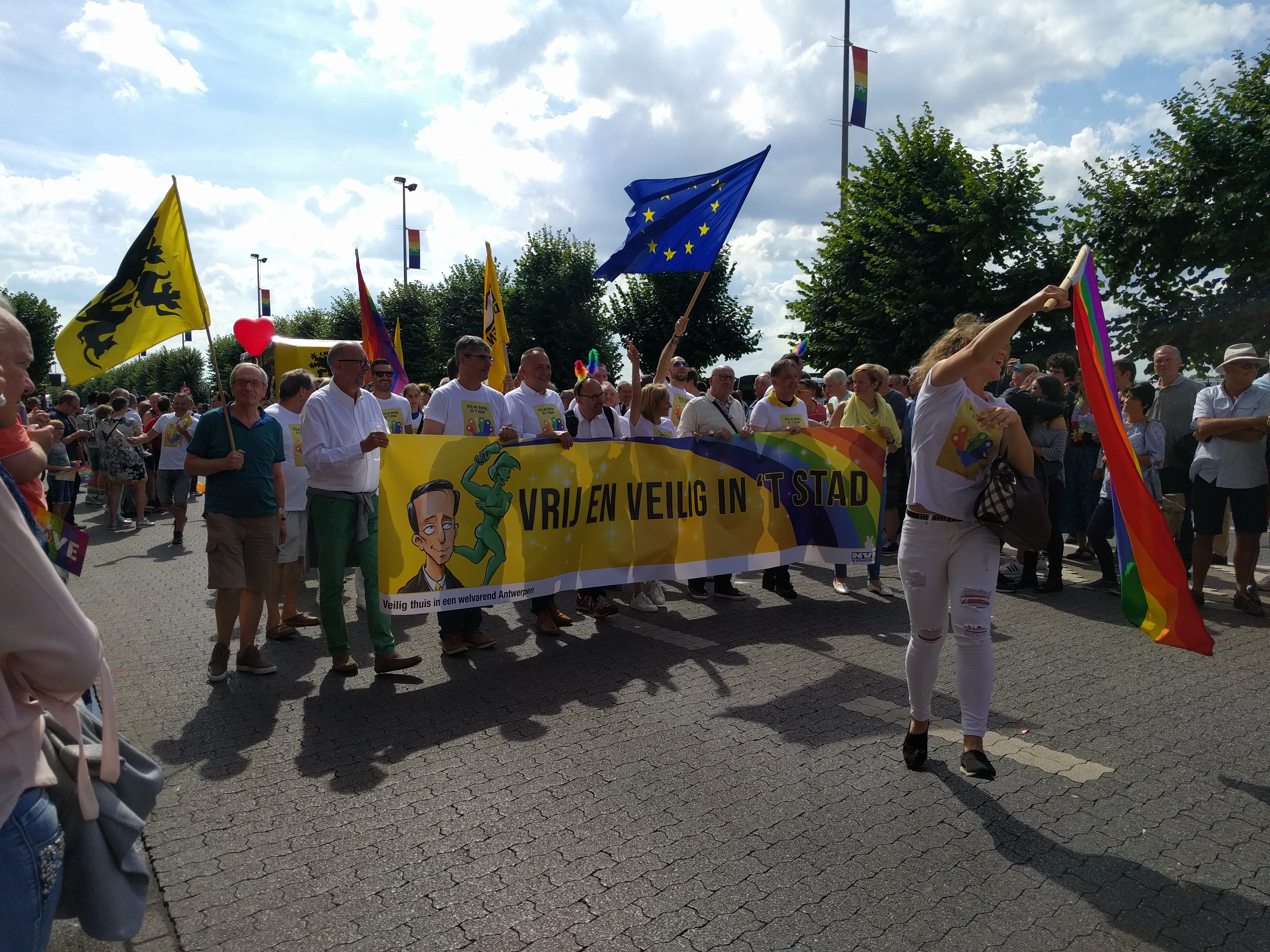
N-VA at the Antwerp Pride 2018 with the slogan "Free and safe in [our] city"

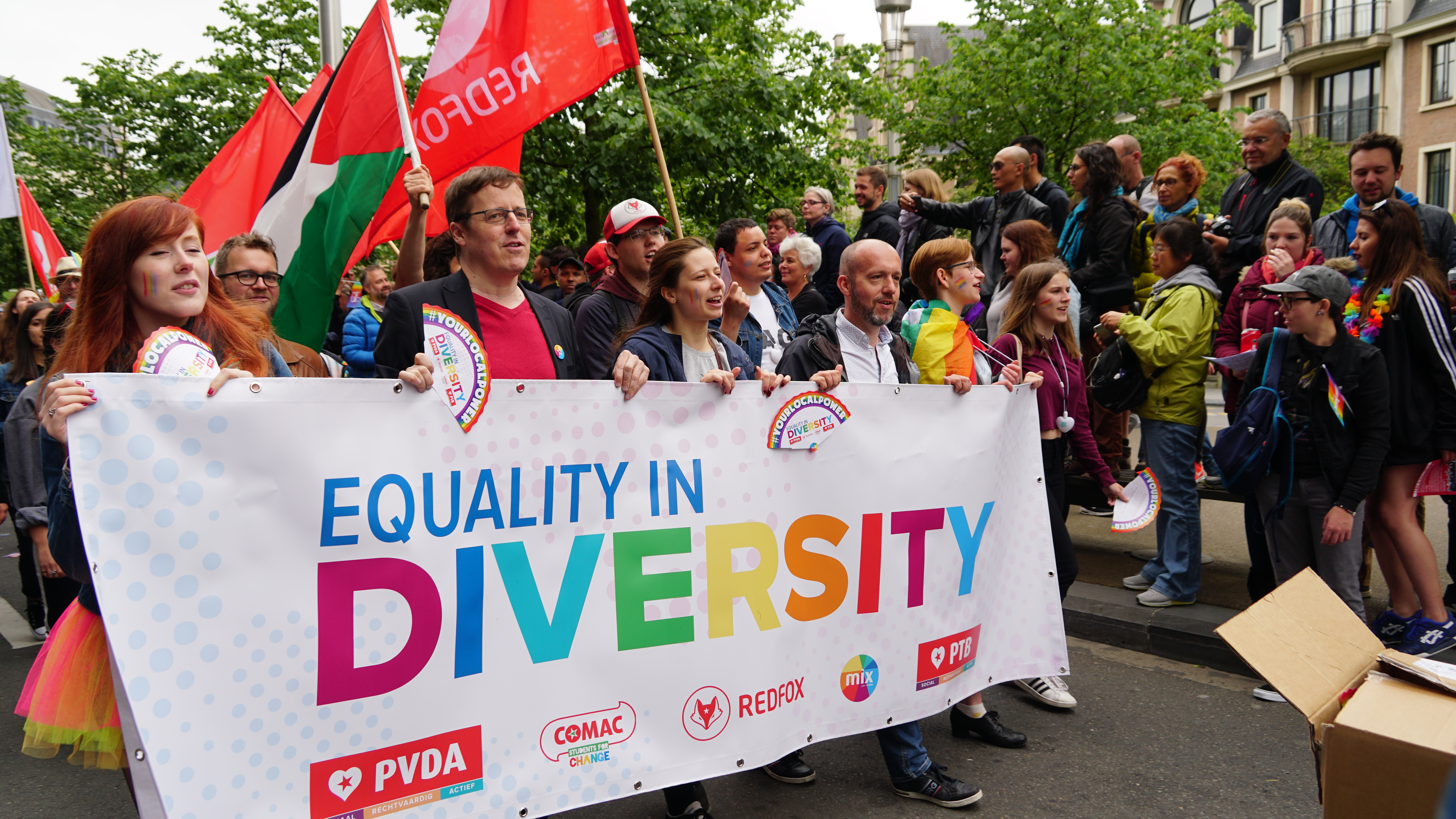
PTB/PVDA at Belgian Pride 2018, along with its student wing (Comac) and its youth wing (RedFox)

LGBT rights are supported by the main political parties. When voting on the same-sex marriage bill, the Flemish Liberals and Democrats (VLD), the Christian People's Party (CVP/CD&V), the Socialist Party (PS), the Socialist Party Differently (sp.a), Ecolo, Agalev and the People's Union voted generally in favour except for several abstentions, whereas the Flemish Block and the National Front voted against, the Christian Social Party (CSP/cdH) voted against with several abstentions and the Reformist Movement (MR) voted dividedly. The right-wing Flemish Interest (Vlaams Belang, formerly Flemish Block) was opposed to same-sex marriage and LGBT rights more broadly, but has softened its stance in recent years. In 2015, party leader Tom Van Grieken said the party would not campaign to repeal same-sex marriage. Member of the Flemish Parliament Filip Dewinter told the newspaper De Standaard in 2014 that the party would now approve of same-sex marriage.

Several politicians are openly gay, two notable examples being the former Prime Minister of Belgium, Elio Di Rupo (PS) and the former Flemish Minister for Education (in the Peeters II Government), Pascal Smet (Vooruit). LGBT members of the Flemish Parliament include, among others, Piet De Bruyn (N-VA), Lorin Parys (N-VA) and Wellen Mayor Els Robeyns (sp.a).

On 2 April 2014, the Flemish Parliament approved 96–0 (with 15 abstentions) a resolution introduced by MP Piet De Bruyn (N-VA) and supported by all political parties except Flemish Interest, calling for the government to take measures to support and advance the acceptance of transgender people in society.

In the 2014 European Parliament election, UZ Gent gynaecologist Petra De Sutter was second on the list of Green candidates, marking it the first time a Belgian transgender person was a candidate for the EU Parliament. De Sutter has served as a member of the Belgian Senate since June 2014, and joined the European Parliament for the European Green Party after the 2019 elections. She left the European Parliament in 2020, and was sworn in as Minister of Civil Service in October of that year.

Following the 2014 European Parliament elections, the New Flemish Alliance (N-VA) was criticized for joining the European Conservatives and Reformists parliamentary group, which contains several right-wing homophobic parties. However, N-VA asserted they would vote in favour of LGBT rights, and argued that this was an opportunity to change opinions of other parties in that group.

In 2019, Dominiek Spinnewyn-Sneppe, newly-elected federal member of Parliament and member of Flemish Interest, was quoted in an interview as criticizing same-sex marriage and adoption by same-sex couples. After public outcry, party chairman Tom Van Grieken condemned her words, claiming they did not reflect his own opinion or that of the party. While he defended her right to free speech, he claimed that Flemish Interest will not seek to reverse any acquired rights of the LGBT community.

=== Media ===
Homosexuality is widely accepted in the media. Popular TV series such as Thuis, Skam Belgique and wtFOCK (the last two being adaptations of the Norwegian series Skam) feature gay characters.

The first TV personality to publicly come out as gay was singer Will Ferdy (nl) in 1970, when the topic was still taboo.

In 2018, journalist Bo Van Spilbeeck (nl) came out as transgender. This received widespread media coverage.

== LGBT rights movement in Belgium ==
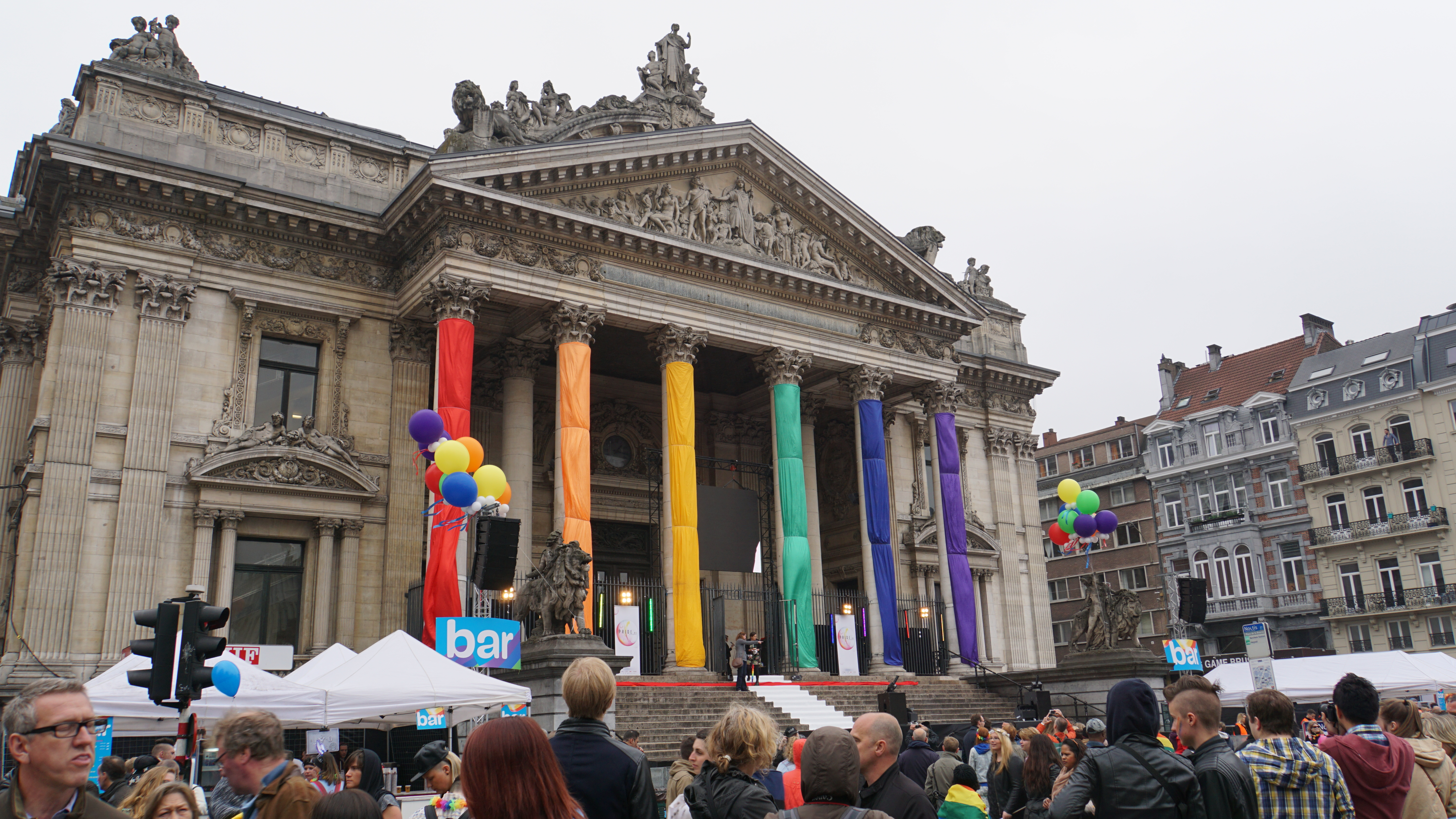
The Bourse Palace in Brussels decorated with rainbow banners and flags during Belgian Pride 2015

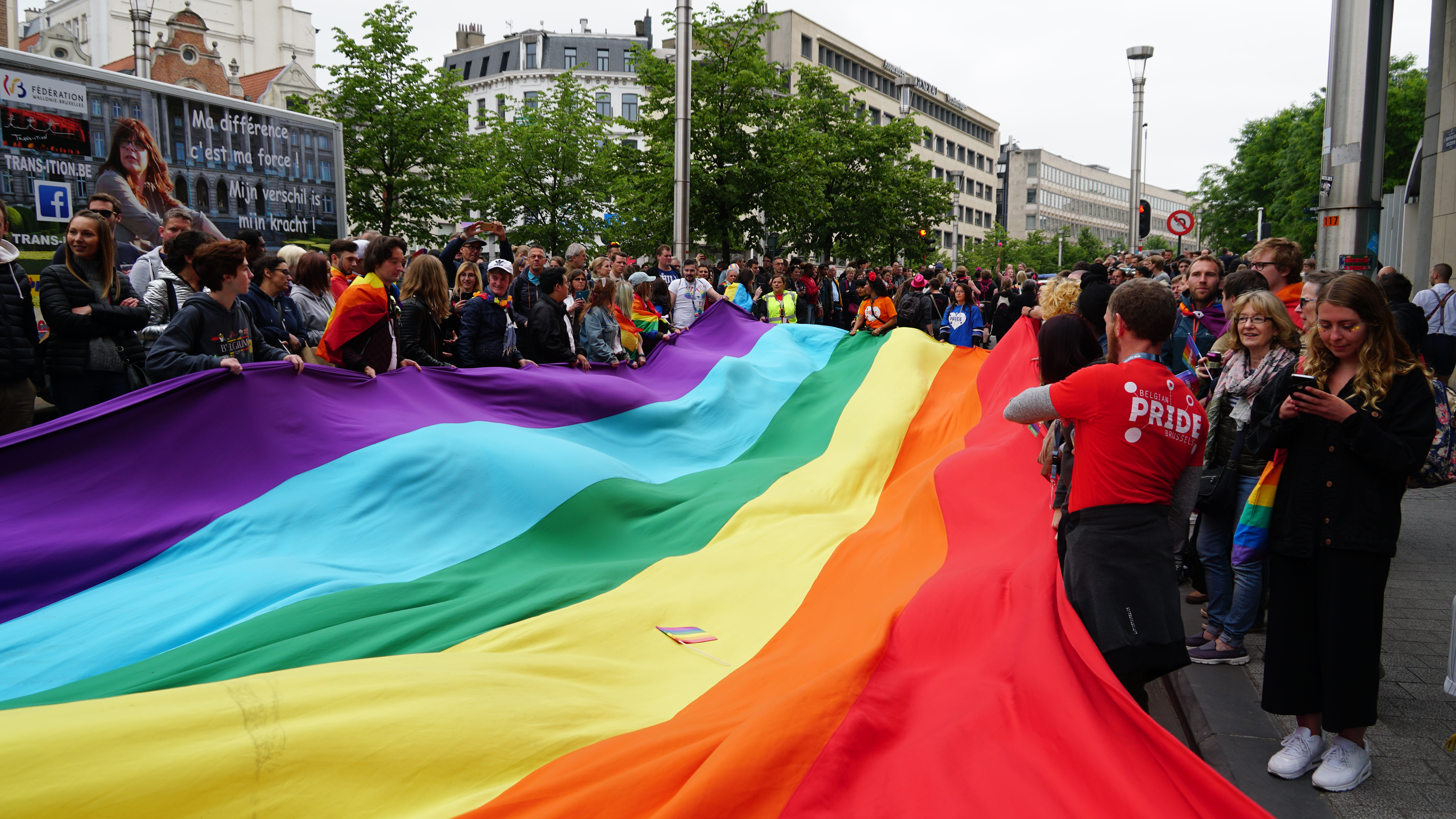
Participants at Belgian Pride in 2018, Brussels

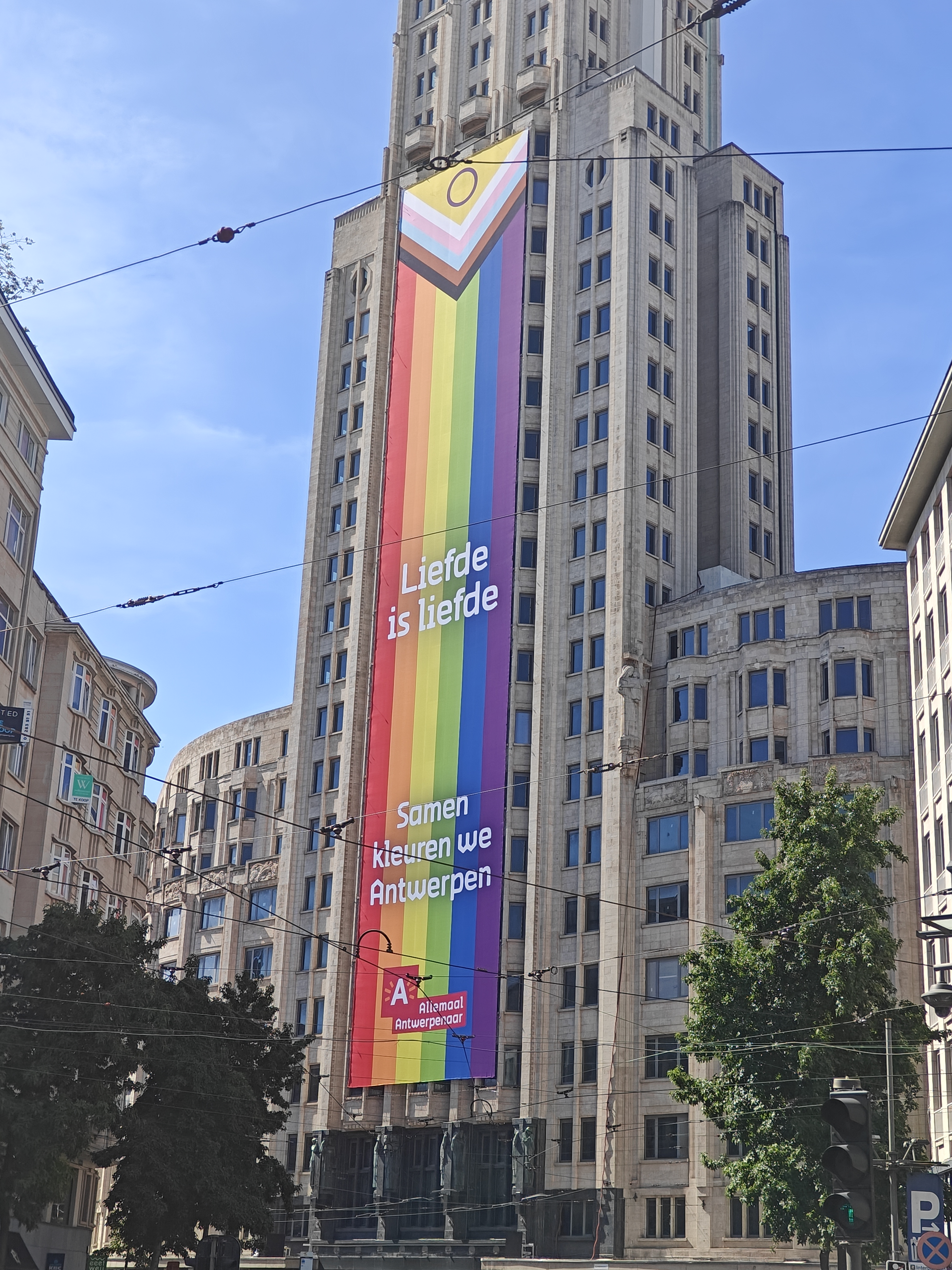
The Boerentoren during Antwerp Pride 2026: "Love is love - together we colour Antwerp"

Belgian gay rights activists are grouped into several organisations; Çavaria, and Wel Jong (Before known as "Wel jong Niet hetero" dutch for "Young But Not Straight"), two Dutch-speaking organisations in the Flemish and Brussels regions, and the Federation des Associations Gayes et Lesbiennes in the French-speaking Walloon and Brussels regions.

Belgian gay rights activism is made most visible by means of pride parade demonstrations. Marches have been held annually in Belgium's capital Brussels since 1996, with similar events having been held intermittently in preceding years in both Brussels and other cities. While the marches have a festive character, they are also used to present the gay movement's political agenda in the form of a list of demands. The list has been updated a number of times and has included demands for anti-discrimination laws, inclusion of gay relationships in high school sex education and the right to adoption by same-sex parents.

In the 2007 march, some participants were seen with a banner "Thank you Verhofstadt!", in reference to the fact that same-sex marriage in Belgium and other LGBT reforms were realised by the first two governments of Prime Minister Guy Verhofstadt (Open VLD), which respectively consisted of liberals, socialists and greens, and of liberals and socialists.

Prior to 1998, the marches were held under the name Roze Zaterdag – Samedi Rose ("Pink Saturday"). The name was adopted for the first ever Belgian demonstration march for gay rights in 1979, taken from the same-named series of Dutch marches which were first held in 1977. The 1979 march was organised on 5 May in Brussels, with subsequent marches the next two years in respectively Antwerp and Brussels again. After this first short series of annual events, it was only in 1990 that the decision was made to again organise the marches regularly, starting anew on 5 May in Antwerp and then bi-annually in Ghent and again in Antwerp. The latter choice of city was motivated by what is known as "Black Sunday", when the right-wing party Vlaams Blok (now Vlaams Belang) scored a major electoral victory in Antwerp. Then in 1996, "Pink Saturday" was moved indefinitely to Brussels, and became an annual event. The next year, the list of demands was for the first time prominently displayed on 10 large banners carried by participants throughout the march. In 1998, the name of the march was changed to Belgian Lesbian and Gay Pride (BLGP), and then in 2009 to Belgian Pride.

In 2013, Antwerp was the host city of the third World Outgames. The 2019 Belgian Pride parade was attended by an estimated 100,000 people.

== Summary table ==
Right	Status
Same-sex sexual activity legal	Yes (Since 1795)
Equal age of consent (16)	Yes (Since 1985)
Anti-discrimination laws in employment	Yes (Since 2003)
Anti-discrimination laws in the provision of goods and services	Yes (Since 2003)
Anti-discrimination laws in all other areas (incl. indirect discrimination, hate speech)	Yes (Since 2003)
Anti-discrimination laws concerning gender identity	Yes (Since 2014)
Same-sex marriage	Yes (Since 2003)
Recognition of same-sex couples (e.g. unregistered cohabitation, life partnership)	Yes (Since 2000)
Stepchild adoption by same-sex couples	Yes (Since 2006)
Joint adoption by same-sex couples	Yes (Since 2006)
Automatic parenthood on birth certificates for children of same-sex couples	Yes (Since 2015)
LGBT people allowed to serve openly in the military	Yes
Right to change legal gender	Yes (Since 2007)
Right to change legal gender based on self-determination	Yes (Since 2018)
Access to IVF for lesbian couples	Yes (Since 2006)
Commercial surrogacy for gay male couples	Yes (Since 2022)
Conversion therapy banned by law	Yes (Since 2023)
Intersex minors protected from invasive surgical procedures	No
Non-binary gender recognition	No
Altruistic surrogacy for gay male couples	Yes
MSMs allowed to donate blood	Yes / No (Since 1 July 2023, 4-month deferral period)

== See also ==
- Human rights in Belgium
- LGBTQ rights in Europe
- LGBTQ rights in the European Union
- Genres Pluriels, an NGO active for gender fluid, transgender and intersex rights
