= Nweke =

Nweke is a surname. Notable people with the surname include:

- Collins Nweke (born 1965), Belgian politician
- Frank Nweke (born 1965), Nigerian politician
- Grace Nweke, New Zealand netball player
