= 2014 European Parliament election in Belgium =

- 25 May 2014

All 21 Belgian seats to the European Parliament
- Turnout: 89.64%
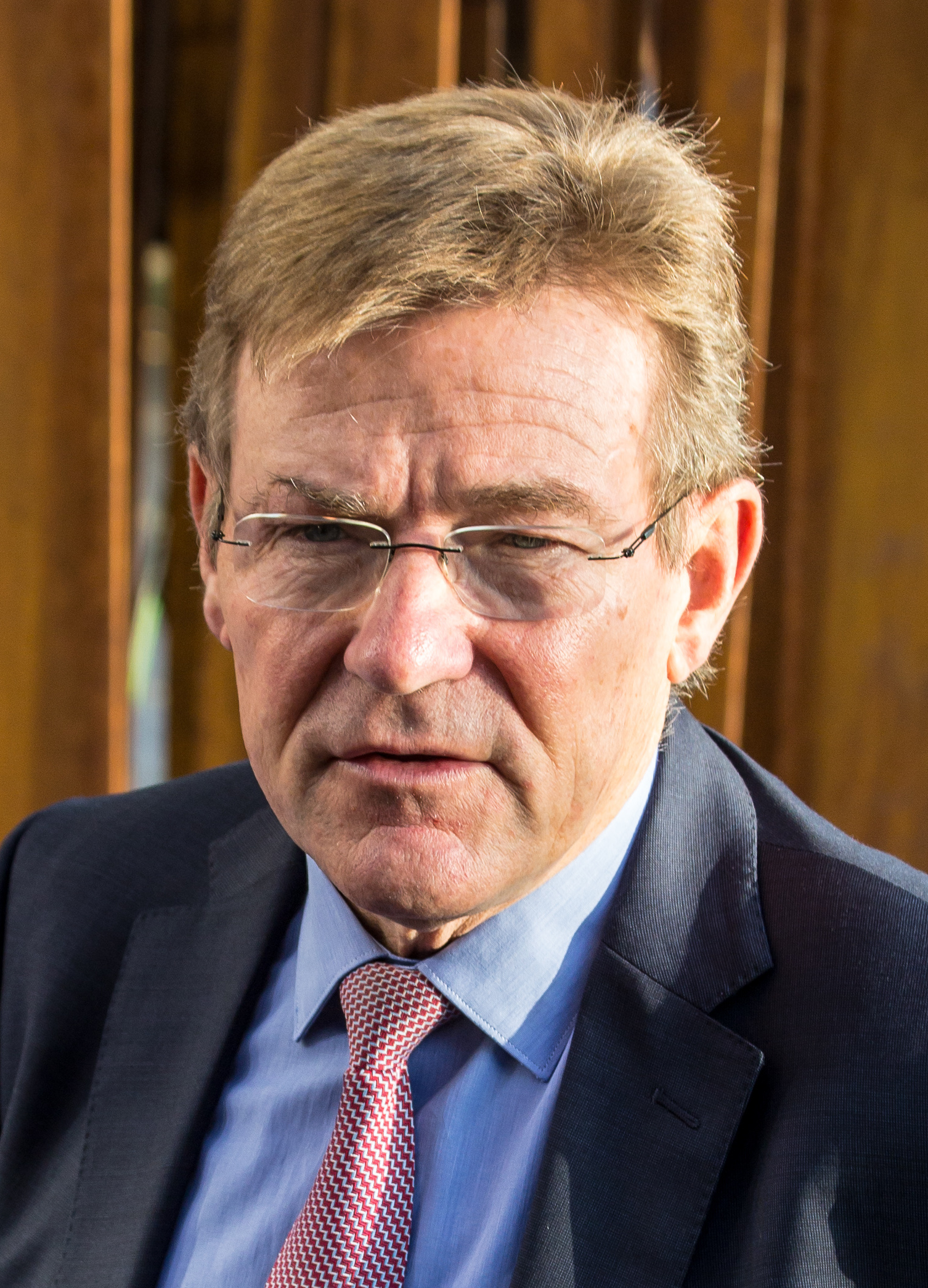

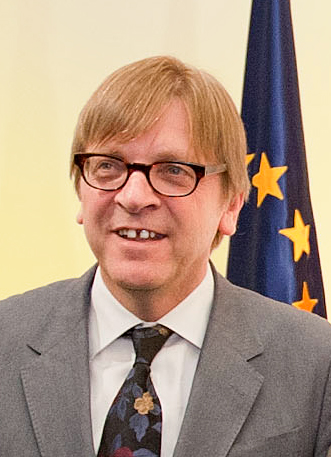

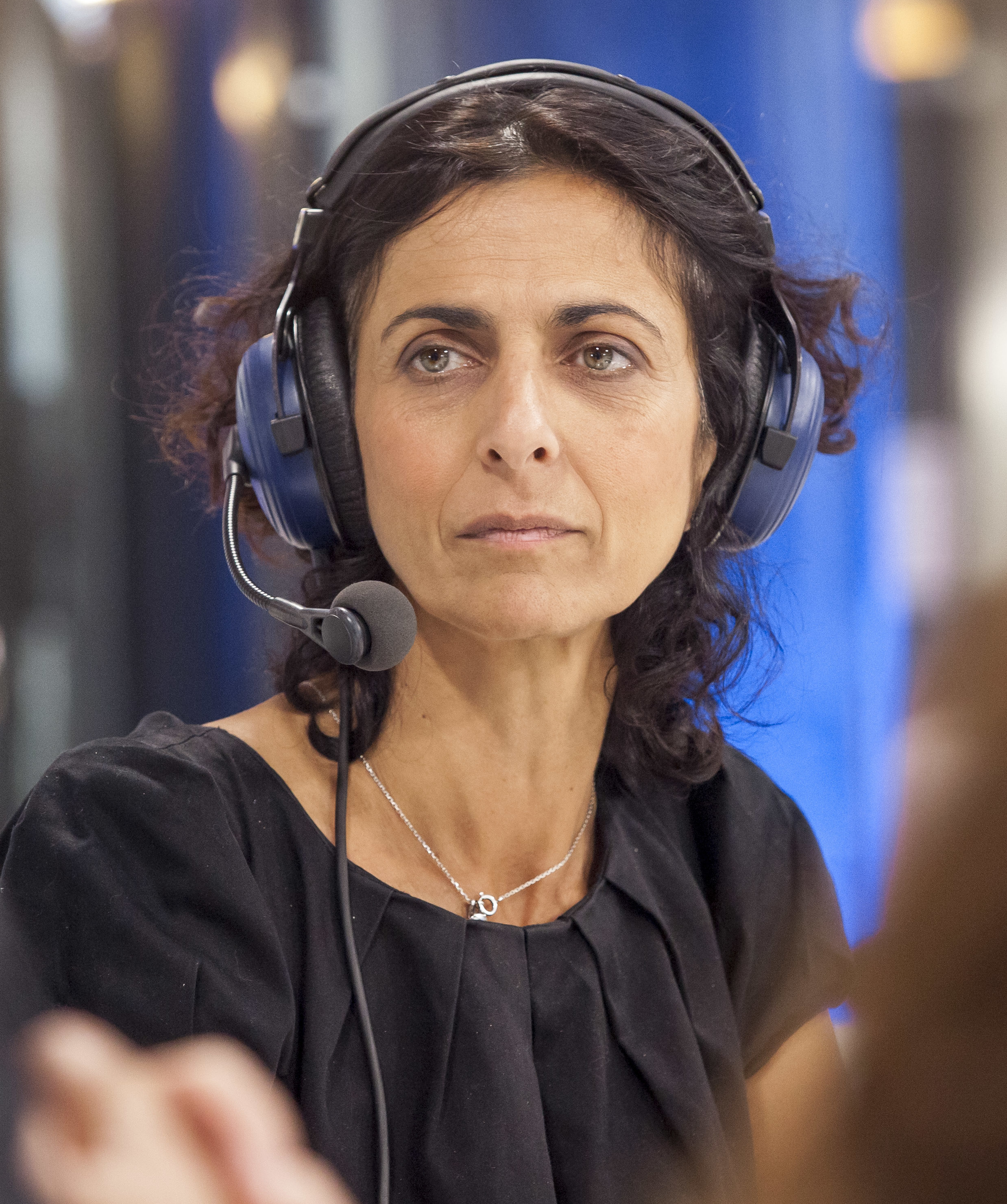

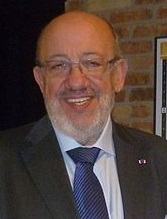

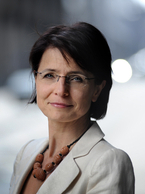
	First party	Second party	Third party
Leader	Johan Van Overtveldt	Guy Verhofstadt	Marie Arena
Party	N-VA	Open Vld	PS
Alliance	EFA	ALDE	PES
Last election	1 seat, 6.13%	3 seats, 12.75%	3 seats, 10.88%
Seats won	4	3	3
Seat change	▲3	Steady	Steady
Popular vote	1,123,363	859,254	714,784
Percentage	16.79%	12.84%	10.68%
Swing	▲10.66%	▲0.09%	▼0.2%
	Fourth party	Fifth party
Leader	Louis Michel	Marianne Thyssen
Party	MR	CD&V
Alliance	ALDE	EPP
Last election	2 seats, 9.74%	3 seats, 14.43%
Seats won	3	2
Seat change	▲1	▼1
Popular vote	661,408	840,814
Percentage	9.88%	12.56%
Swing	▲0.14%	▼1.86%

An election was held on 25 May 2014 in the three Belgian constituencies (the Dutch-speaking electoral college, the French-speaking electoral college and the German-speaking electoral college) to elect the Belgian delegation to the European Parliament. This election, part of the 2014 European Parliament election, was held on the same day alongside the Belgian federal election and the Belgian regional elections.

21 Belgium MEPs were elected: 12 of them are Dutch-speaking, 8 of them are French-speaking and 1 of them is German-speaking. In the arrondissement of Brussels-Capital and six municipalities with language facilities, voters can choose whether to vote for the Dutch-speaking or for the French-speaking electoral college.

== Opinion polling ==
Date	Polling Firm	CD&V	VLD	PS	VB	MR	Ecolo	sp.a	N-VA	cdH	Groen	PVDA/PTB	CSP	PP	FDF	Others
23 April 2014	PollWatch2014	10.7	11.5	10.2	6.4	8.4	3.9	8.6	20.7	3.7	4.9	3.0	0.2	–	1.4	6.4
16 April 2014	PollWatch2014	9.7	7.4	10.0	7.9	8.4	5.1	7.4	16.6	5.2	5.4	4.9	0.2	3.3	2.3	11.1
7 June 2009	Election results	14.4	12.7	10.9	9.8	9.7	8.6	8.2	6.1	5.0	4.9	1.0	0.2	—N/a	—N/a	11.9

=== Opinion polling for the Dutch electoral college ===
Date	Polling Firm	CD&V	VLD	VB	sp.a	N-VA	Groen	PVDA	Others	Lead
16 May	De Standaard	24.3	19.3	7.7	15.8	20.0	11.4	1.4	0.1	4.3
25 Apr	De Standaard	19.0	16.7	7.9	13.9	27.3	10.9	1.7	2.6	8.3
7 June 2009	European Elections 2009	23.3	20.6	15.9	13.2	9.9	7.9	1.0	8.3	2.7

== Candidates ==
- Full list of candidates

=== Main candidates ===
Dutch electoral college
Party	Name
Christian Democratic and Flemish (CD&V)	Marianne Thyssen
Green (Groen)	Bart Staes
New Flemish Alliance (N-VA)	Johan Van Overtveldt
Open Flemish Liberals and Democrats (Open Vld)	Guy Verhofstadt
Socialist Party–Differently (sp.a)	Kathleen Van Brempt
Flemish Interest (Vlaams Belang)	Gerolf Annemans

French electoral college
Party	Name
Humanist Democratic Centre (cdH)	Claude Rolin
Confederated Ecologists (Ecolo)	Philippe Lamberts
Reformist Movement (MR)	Louis Michel
Socialist Party (PS)	Marie Arena

German electoral college
Party	Name
Christian Social Party (CSP)	Pascal Arimont

== Results ==
Party	Votes	%	Seats
French-speaking electoral college
Socialist Party	714,645	29.29	3
Reformist Movement	661,332	27.10	3
Ecolo	285,196	11.69	1
Humanist Democratic Centre	277,246	11.36	1
People's Party	145,909	5.98	0
Workers' Party of Belgium	133,811	5.48	0
Francophone Democratic Federalists	82,540	3.38	0
Debout Les Belges!	72,671	2.98	0
La Droite	38,813	1.59	0
Vega	15,208	0.62	0
Stand Up USE	7,970	0.33	0
MG	4,705	0.19	0
Total	2,440,046	100.00	8
Dutch-speaking electoral college
New Flemish Alliance	1,123,355	26.67	4
Open Flemish Liberals and Democrats	859,099	20.40	3
Christian Democratic and Flemish	840,783	19.96	2
Socialist Party Differently	555,348	13.18	1
Green	447,391	10.62	1
Vlaams Belang	284,856	6.76	1
Workers' Party of Belgium	101,237	2.40	0
Total	4,212,069	100.00	12
German-speaking electoral college
Christian Social Party	11,710	30.34	1
Ecolo	6,429	16.66	0
Party for Freedom and Progress	6,197	16.06	0
Socialist Party	5,835	15.12	0
ProDG	5,106	13.23	0
Vivant	3,319	8.60	0
Total	38,596	100.00	1
Valid votes	6,690,711	93.90	
Invalid/blank votes	434,450	6.10	
Total votes	7,125,161	100.00	
Registered voters/turnout	7,948,854	89.64	
Source: Belgian Elections
