= Gravensteengroep =

The Gravensteengroep is a group of Flemish artists and intellectuals established to promote the Flemish demands for more autonomy. The group comprises persons of varying political views, who do share basic values such as democracy and human rights. Their main concern is that the Flemish demands for more autonomy are often associated with extremism and nationalism, which they argue is not true. The Gravensteengroep's modus operandi consists of publishing manifestos, which explain why they see the Flemish demands as reasonable and just.

== History ==
The group was established in early 2008, at a location close to the Gravensteen in Ghent. Its first manifesto was published on 21 February 2008, a period during which the demands for Flemish autonomy made the formation of a Belgian government very difficult.

The signatories of this manifesto, who call themselves the Gravensteen Group, each start from different political and ideological main points, but agree in their attachment to democracy and human rights. They put central the values of freedom, equality, solidarity and mutual respect, and reject all forms of racism and xenophobia.

They have been however worried by the fact that in the recent discussions concerning the state reform of Belgium, the impression is awoken that reasonable and equitable Flemish requirements are associated each time with extreme right thinking. For this reason they brought together their points of view in the Gravensteen Manifestos.

A countergroup called the Vooruitgroep was established shortly after the Gravensteengroep released its first manifesto.

As of 2020 the group has written several dozen manifestos.

== Members ==
Its members include:

- Ludo Abicht, philosopher at the University of Antwerp
- Peter De Graeve, philosopher at the University of Antwerp
- Paul De Ridder, historian and department chief of the Royal Library in Brussels
- Jo Decaluwe, director, actor and teacher
- Eric Defoort, historian and Honorary Teacher at the Catholic University of Brussels
- Dirk Denoyelle, comedian
- Paul Ghijsels, singer
- Bart Maddens, Principle Teacher Catholic University of Leuven at the Faculty of Social Sciences, Center for Politicology
- Chris Michel
- Yves Panneels, entrepreneur
- Jean-Pierre Rondas, broadcaster for the Flemish radio
- Johan Sanctorum, philosopher and columnist
- Bart Staes, member of the European Parliament for the Flemish Green party
- Bart Vanhecke, composer
- Frans-Jos Verdoodt, writer
- Jan Verheyen, film director
- Etienne Vermeersch, Professor at the State University Ghent

Former members:

- Piet van Eeckhaut, lawyer
