= Nabilla Ait Daoud =

Belgian politician

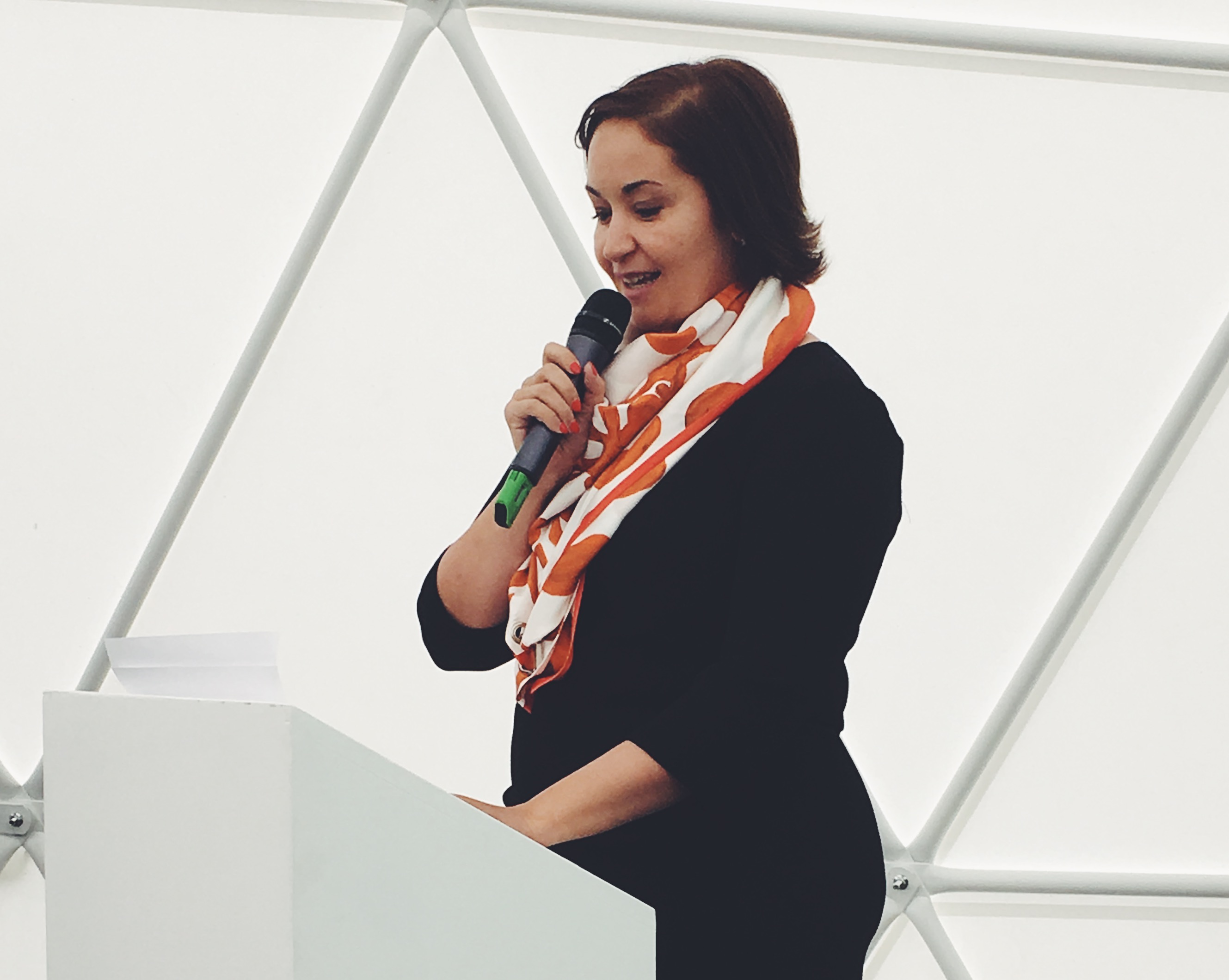

Flemish minister of Youth, Childcare, Environment and Animal Welfare
- Incumbent
- Assumed office 2017
- Prime Minister: Jan Jambon

Personal details
- Born: 4 January 1977 (age 49) Antwerp, Belgium
- Citizenship: Belgian
- Party: N-VA

Nabilla Ait Daoud (born 4 January 1977) is a Belgian politician affiliated to the New Flemish Alliance party who is the deputy mayor of Antwerp and a member of the Flemish government serving as minister for childcare and animal welfare.

Ait Daoud graduated with a pharmacology degree in 1998 before working as an assistant in a pharmacy store. In 2005 she opened a sandwich shop in Antwerp.

In 2012, she was elected as a municipal councillor in Antwerp for the N-VA and a year later was appointed by Bart De Wever as deputy mayor and an alderman for the city. During her time as an alderman, she planned to make Antwerp the first low emissions city in Belgium and despite coming from a Muslim background, has campaigned for a ban on non-stun slaughter in the city, arguing that “religion should not be a reason to make an animal suffer.”

In 2014, she unsuccessfully stood for the N-VA during the 2014 European parliament election but in 2018 was reelected as a councilor in Antwerp and resumed her position as alderman.

Since 2017, she has served as a board member for the Port Authority of Antwerp and as a director at the University of Antwerp.
