= Kathleen Van Brempt =

Belgian politician

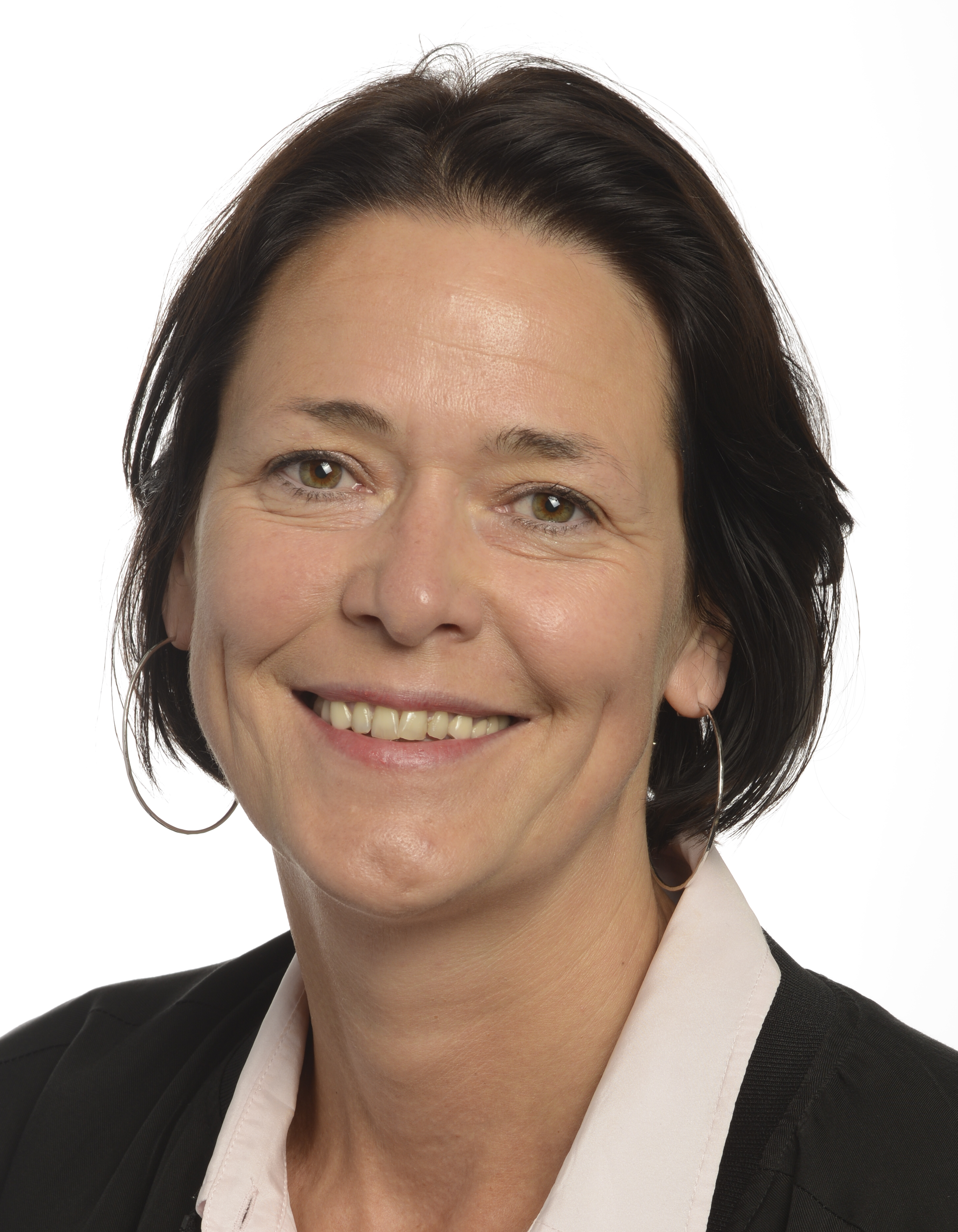

Member of the European Parliament for Belgium
- Incumbent
- Assumed office 7 June 2009

Personal details
- Born: 18 November 1969 (age 56) Wilrijk, Belgium
- Party: Vooruit
- Education: Catholic University of Leuven

Kathleen Van Brempt (pronounced [kɑtˈleːɱ vɑm ˈbrɛmpt]; born 18 November 1969) is a Belgian social-democratic politician and member of Vooruit. She currently serves as Member of the European Parliament (MEP) as part of the Party of European Socialists and is leader of the local branch of her party in Antwerp.

== Education and early career ==
Van Brempt studied at the Katholieke Universiteit Leuven where she became licentiate in sociology in 1991.

After having worked for the sp.a in capacity of a researcher and as political secretary to Louis Tobback, in 1999 Van Brempt was appointed deputy chief of staff to the minister of employment Renaat Landuyt.

== Political career ==
=== Member of the European Parliament, 2000–2003 ===
In her first term as Member of the European Parliament from 6 January 2000 to 1 October 2003, Van Brempt served on the Committee on Culture, Youth, Education, the Media and Sport (2000–2002) and the Committee on the Environment, Public Health and Consumer Policy (2002–2003).

=== Role in Belgian politics ===
On 1 October 2003, Van Brempt resigned from the European Parliament to become State Secretary for Labor organization and Welfare in the working place in the second Belgian federal government headed by Prime Minister Guy Verhofstadt. During the regional elections of 2004, Van Brempt was elected to the Flemish Parliament and she became Minister for Mobility, Social Economy and Equal Opportunities in the Flemish government.

Since 2001, Van Brempt is a member of the city council of Antwerp.

=== Member of the European Parliament, 2009–present ===
In the 2009 European elections, Van Brempt was elected as Member of the European Parliament in the Socialist fraction. She was re-elected in the 2014 elections.

From 2009 until 2019, Van Brempt served on the Committee on Industry, Research and Energy. In this capacity, she was a member of the European Parliament's delegation of observers to the 2014 United Nations Climate Change Conference in Lima and the 2015 United Nations Climate Change Conference in Paris. In 2016, Van Brempt was made chair of the Volkswagen emissions scandal inquiry into whether the EU should have acted more quickly to address the issue; she was elected in an unopposed race. She has been a member of the Committee on International Trade (since 2019), the Parliament's delegation to the Conference on the Future of Europe (since 2021) and the Special Committee on the COVID-19 pandemic (since 2022).

In addition to her committee assignments, Van Brempt has served on the parliament's delegations for relations with Iran (2009–2014) and Canada (2014–2019) and to the ACP–EU Joint Parliamentary Assembly (since 2019). She is also a member of the European Parliament Intergroup on Western Sahara, the European Parliament Intergroup on the Welfare and Conservation of Animals; the European Parliament Intergroup on Extreme Poverty and Human Rights; and the MEP Heart Group, a group of parliamentarians who have an interest in promoting measures that will help reduce the burden of cardiovascular diseases (CVD).

Within the Socialists and Democrats group, Van Brempt served as vice-chairwoman under the leadership of successive chairmen Gianni Pittella (2014–2018) and Udo Bullmann (2018–2019). In this capacity, she was responsible for sustainable development, environment, industry and transport. In March 2018, she lost out against Bullmann in the group's internal vote on a new leader; Bullmann received 86 votes, while Van Brempt got 61 votes.

In April 2022 Van Brempt was elected as chair of the Parliament's Special Committee on COVID-19.

== Other activities ==
- European Council on Foreign Relations (ECFR), Member of the Council

== Recognition ==
In December 2020, Van Brempt received the International Trade award at The Parliament Magazine's annual MEP Awards.
