= Collins Nweke =

Author, International Trade Consultant & former Belgian politician (born 1965)

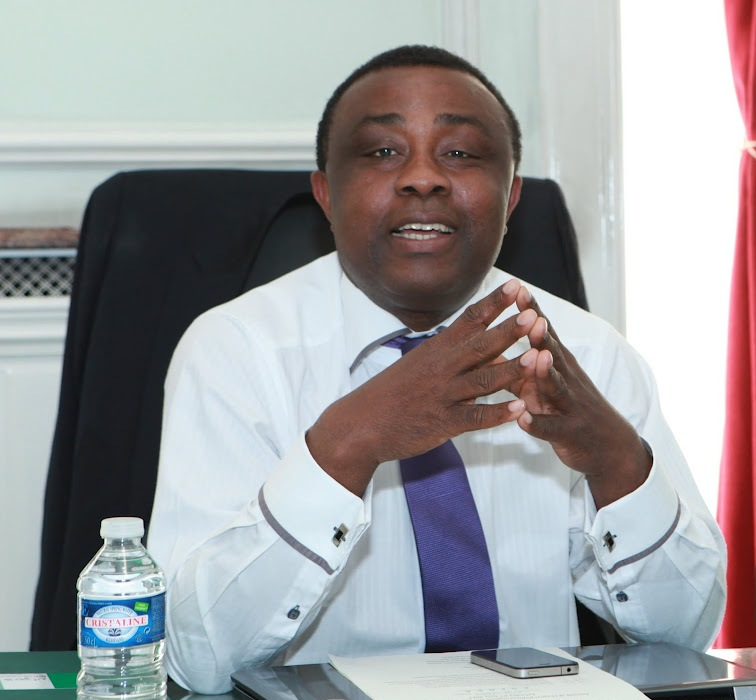
- Collins Nweke in 2013

Councillor Social Affairs
- In office 2 January 2019 – 1 January 2025
- Preceded by: Bertrand Peirsegaele

City Councillor
- In office 2 January 2013 – 1 January 2019
- Preceded by: Geert Lambert
- Succeeded by: Belinda Torres Leclercq

Councillor Social Affairs
- In office 2 January 2011 – 1 January 2013
- Preceded by: Herman Lodewyckx
- Succeeded by: Kristof Cornelis

Personal details
- Born: Collins Nweke; 14 July 1965 (age 61)
- Party: Groen
- Spouse: Tonia Nweke
- Profession: Management Consulting
- Website: www.collinsnweke.eu

Collins Nweke (born 14 July 1965 in Igbuzo, Nigeria) is the author of Economic Diplomacy of the Diaspora (2026) and International Trade Consultant affiliated with Belgium's CBL-ACP Chamber of Commerce. A former Belgian politician of the Green Party, he was sworn in for a third term of office on 2 January 2019 as councillor for social affairs in the government of Mayor Bart Tommelein at the Ostend City Council in West Flanders province. Collins Nweke is of Nigerian origin, and settled in Belgium in 1993. He is the first non-Belgian-born person to be elected to political office in West Flanders. He is particularly active in social welfare, economy, international development and ethnic minority issues. He stood as a candidate for the European Parliament in the 2014 elections. At the end of his third term in December 2024, Collins Nweke did not seek re-election to political office, preferring instead to focus more actively on international trade consulting, research, writing, and media policy analysis. Since retiring from active party politics, Collins Nweke authored a book, Economic Diplomacy of the Diaspora. This is a pioneering book-length large volume ever authored in that genre. It was published in February 2026.

Nweke has been chief executive and chairman of Nigerians in Diaspora (NIDO) in Europe, and has been active in consultancy and advocacy in the field of socio-economic development for Nigeria and for Africa in general and for a fairer Europe-Africa trade relations. Effective 23 February 2026, Collins Nweke became President of the International Association of Research Scholars and Administrators Corporation (IARSAC), US following appointment by the President-General, Prof. Akin Ogunsakin of its parent body, IARSA Consortium.

== Personal life ==
Collins Nweke was born in Nigeria and migrated to Belgium in 1993. He has dual Nigerian-Belgian citizenship.

Nweke is multilingual English-Dutch and lives with his wife, Tonia in Ostend, Belgium. They have two young adult sons, Tonna Jessy (Teejay) Nweke (born 11 March 1994) and Chidi Rae Nweke (born 15 October 1996). He is a frequent traveller to Nigeria, his country of origin, where virtually all members of the large Nweke family clan reside. His late father, Obi (Eze) Adigwe Nweke (died 1/08/2025), was a traditional ruler and member of Ndi Nze Traditional Ruling Council of his Igbuzo hometown. His mother, Loveth Nweke, died 5/09/2014, a couple of days prior to his speech accepting a Leadership Service Award in Hamburg, Germany on 7 September 2014. He dedicated the Award to his mother.

== Education ==
Collins Nweke trained in Mass Communications (OND), International Business Management (BCom) and Management Social Economy (MSE) partly in Nigeria but mainly in Europe. He also holds a Belgian 'Graduaat' in Corporate Policy and a Doctor of Governance (Honoris Causa) awarded in 2014. Collins Nweke is a Fellow of the Institute of Management Consultants (FIMC) as well as a Certified Management Consultant (CMC). He is a Distinguished Fellow of the International Association of Research Scholars & Administrators, a body of which he was appointed Vice President in 2023 and appointed President of its USA arm, IARSAC effective 23 February 2026. He is on Governing Council of the Consortium He equally holds the highest professional title of Fellow Chartered Public Manager (FCPM) of the Chartered Institute of Public Management of Nigeria.

== Employment and professional activities ==
Before migrating, Nweke taught English literature at Omu Boys' Secondary School, Ibusa. He then worked for five years at the United Bank for Africa plc.

In Belgium, he worked in a team providing the European Commission Justice & Home Affairs Directorate with comparative research and analyses of ethnic minority participation in European business and politics. He later led a team of students on internship from the University College of West-Flanders in the development of a resource center with employment services tailored towards the labour market needs of ethnic minority groups in 2004, culminating in a highly successful national conference of private–public partners. From 2002 to 2004 he was employed by the Ostend civil service department of Social Welfare where he established a digital Legal Research Centre for social and policy matters. A management consultant, Collins also works in the hospitality management sector, which is the mainstay of the Ostend local economy. He was co-founder, in collaboration with Reginald Moreels, then Belgian Minister of International Development, of the Jakoeboe Refugee Welfare Association in Ostend. Nweke was founding board chairman.

=== Nigerians in Diaspora in Europe ===
Nweke was chief executive of the board of trustees of Nigerians in Diaspora in Europe (NIDO Europe) from 2004 to 2006 and as general secretary from 2007 to 2009, and was elected chairman in 2011. Collaborating with Global Diaspora in the Americas, Asia-Pacific and Africa, Nweke was responsible for a structure with chapters in 18 European countries representing a Nigerian emigrant community (the "Diaspora") of around 6 million, its objective to support the national development of Nigeria. Nweke played a leading role in researching and managing the Nigerian Diaspora input in the 2005 National Political Reforms Conference (NPRC) in Nigeria. He carried out research on the concept of "Out-of-Country Voting" and submitted a briefing to the Nigerian Senate on the subject, culminating in a vote in favor of writing the concept into law. In 2018 he was shortlisted for consideration by President Muhammadu Buhari for the position of director-general of the new Nigerian Diaspora Commission according to African Courier Magazine Germany

As chairman, Nweke focused on trade and investment and the engendering of sustainable strategic management processes. He led a Trade Mission involving 45 Diaspora and 13 investment projects to the State of Osun, Nigeria in August 2012. However, Nweke's efforts to reform the Memorandum and Articles of Association of NIDO Europe at a Summit in Zurich, Switzerland, were thwarted. At the conclusion of his two-year term of office in November 2013, he disbanded the seven-man Board of Trustees and declined to remain in office.

=== Consultancy and advocacy ===
Nweke was advisor to the Government of Nigeria on the role of the Diaspora in national development and consults for a number of public and private sector entities. Working with Peter Tichansky of Business Council for International Understanding (BCIU) and Nigeria Diplomatic Missions, he assisted in international public relations for Nigeria for the democratic Government of President Olusegun Obasanjo. He is a member of the Presidential Strategic Planning Committee on Nigeria Vision 2020. He worked as lead consultant for the African Diaspora Investment Forum in London, originated by NEPAD (New Partnership for Africa's Development), and for the Commonwealth Business Council. A Certified Management Consultant (CMC) Collins is a Fellow Institute of Management Consultants (FIMC). He is also a Fellow Chartered Public Manager (FCPM) of the Chartered Institute of Public Management of Nigeria.

Nweke also worked with Ann Pettifor of Advocacy International UK in lobbying for debt cancellation for African countries. In this capacity he facilitated meetings of Africa Parliamentary Committees in the UK, France, Italy, Germany, Japan and USA with African political leaders. He was co-founder with Prince Francis Abutoh (King Franky) of the Global Change for Africa Awards. He is founder and chief executive of Global Village Consult, brand-owners of Nigeria Human Capital, in collaboration with the Chartered Institute of Personnel Management of Nigeria. Following terror attacks in Nigeria by religious extremist group Boko Haram and political tensions as a result of the postponement of Nigeria's general elections Nweke organized a 'Peace March for Nigeria' on 28 February 2015 at Ostend City Hall and marching to the Nelson Mandela Bridge. Before then, in the Council Sitting of 23 January 2015 of Ostend City Council, Nweke had demanded the inclusion of victims of terrorist attack in Baga, Nigeria in the one-minute silence slated to take place for the victims of the Charlie Hebdo attack in Paris. He motivated his request by arguing that African terrorist attack victims should receive equal condemnation as European victims. The minute silence was allowed after the debate

In the Summer of 2015, Collins Nweke started featuring on TVC News and in the Winter of 2017 on Turkish International Television TRT World as Global Affairs Analyst and African Affairs Analyst respectively, providing commentaries, analyses and opinions on world affairs and African politics. He has been a foreign affairs commentator on Channels TV Diplomatic Channel since winter 2019. In the Dutch language newspaper De Zeewacht of 16 October 2015, page 29 Collins Nweke was described as "European voice on African television" Nweke is also contributor and consultant to London's BEN TV programs such as NigerianAffairs, In Diaspora and The Politics Show. He appeared on 1 April 2014 on the BEN TV London program 'You Decide' promoting issues around youth political empowerment in Nigeria and employment. He is an advocate for parents' active involvement in the education of migrant children and delivers lectures on the matter. He contributes to radio and TV talk-shows on the subject.

His essays and articles include: A Confused Policy Tool (2012), The Joy and Regrets of Law-making (2010), Analysis of Nigerian Financial Sector Reforms (2006), Nigerian Diaspora Leadership Forum Report (November 2005), The Role of the Diaspora in Bridging Scientific and Digital Divides (2005), and Headquarters and Regional Chapters Operations: Towards Synergy in Nigeria’s Developmental Aspirations (2004).

== Political career ==
=== City Advisory board for Ethnic Minorities ===
Collins Nweke fought for the creation of the Ostend City Municipal Advisory Board for Ethnic Minorities in the late 1990s. He went on to be elected the founding chairman of the advisory board but resigned after about a year, frustrated at the lack of opportunity provided by the municipal authority and the civil service for him to carry out his functions. He heightened his agitation as floor member, maintaining that the council was not yet ready for a chairman of ethnic minority background. He called for more transparency, good governance and efficiency in the running of the advisory board. In the October 2004 edition of City Magazine, page 12, "De Grote Klok" Nweke clarified his position on the functioning of the City Advisory board for Ethnic Minorities. The African Ripple Magazine reported that on 4 June 2016, Collins Nweke was honoured with the Award of "Ambassador of Integration and Diversity" and handed a Charter to that effect by Mayor Hilde Claes at a ceremony in Hasselt, Belgium.

=== City councillor ===
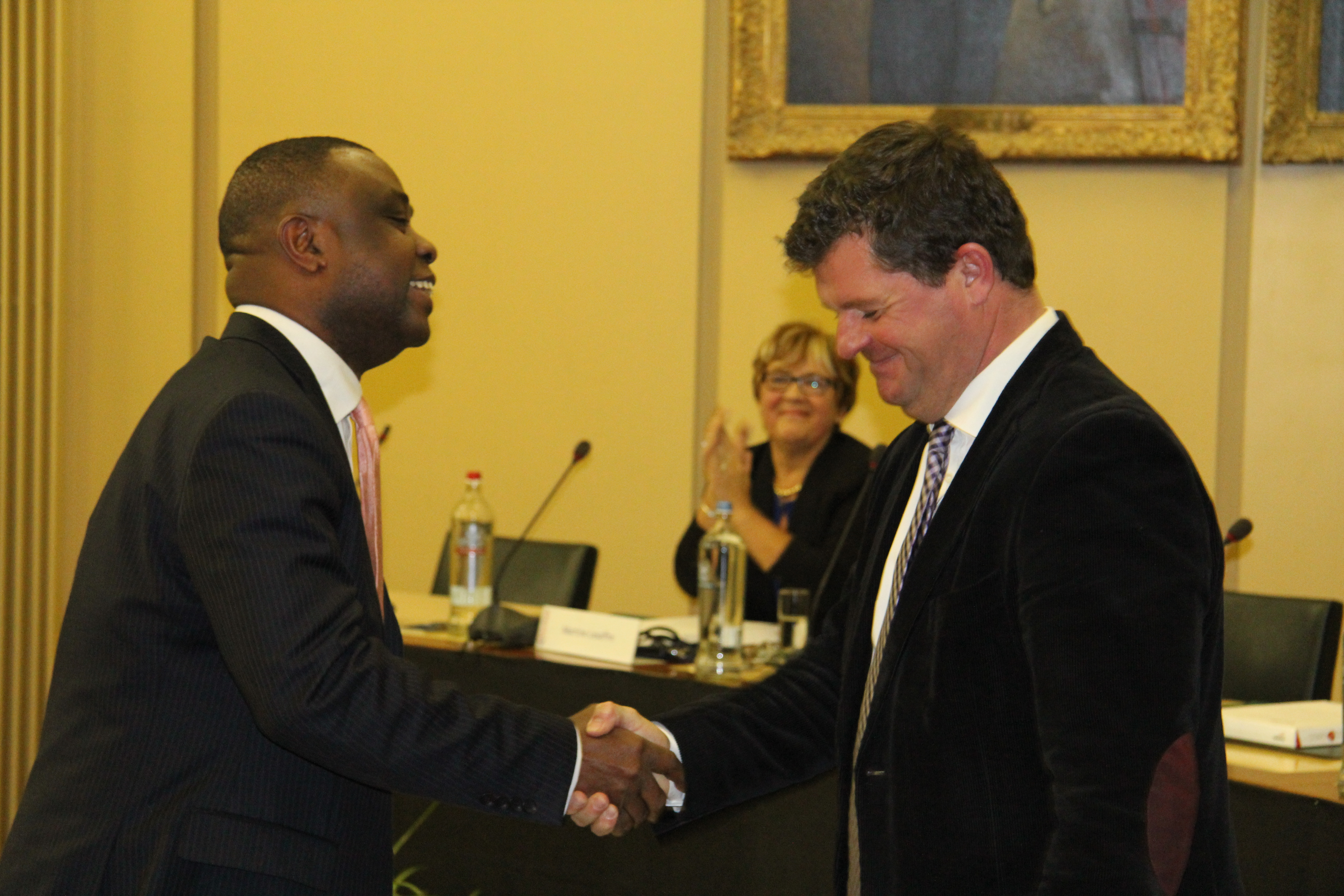
After swearing-in as Ostend City Councillor, Collins being congratulated by the council chairman, Bart Tommelein, January 2013

He participated in the Ostend City Council Election of 2006. He was appointed Green Party Ostend point-man on social policy for the legislative period 2006–2012 and was councillor for social affairs, Public Centre for Social Welfare (OCMW) in the last two years of that legislature, becoming the first person born outside Belgium to occupy such political office in the province of West Flanders. Xpats.com, Invited by Wouter De Vriendt Collins Nweke was not a member of any political party at the time, but he was appointed the party reference person for Social Policy in the legislative period 2006–2012, also was councillor for Social Welfare at the council's Public Center for social welfare.

He was elected by direct vote in 2012 into the city council. His portfolio includes the economy, social policy, international development and equality policy.

Following his election as councillor, he had to resign his membership of the Ostend City Municipal Advisory Board for Ethnic Minorities but continued his activism as opposition politician with ethnic minority affairs under his portfolio.

In the Dutch-language book De Keizer van Oostende, Nweke was credited with bringing about a spirited opposition and debate in the Council for Social Affairs which did not exist before his time. Due to being a lone opposition voice, the book argued, the issues he raised seemed to be largely ignored.

==== Preferential treatment for children of councillors ====
In the Council Session of 7 December 2011, Collins Nweke initiated a campaign to end the practice of preferential treatment for children of councillors in the allocation of places for student jobs. Nweke continued to mount a strong opposition to the practice, arguing in Council that it was unjustified for his own two teenage sons to be employed by Council simply because their father happened to be a councillor.

==== Economisch Huis Oostende controversy ====
Early in 2014, Nweke expressed concern about the efficiency of the State Owned Enterprise (SOE), Economisch Huis Oostende (House of the Economy Ostend) in delivering its corporate goals despite considerable resources which the council had invested in it. He however declared that he was ready to give a fair chance to the new Alderman, Niko Geldhof, to inject some impetus into the firm. In the summer of 2014 Nweke commended the development on social media. However, before the monthly Council debate session of August 2014, Nweke raised questions about substantial losses the firm had recorded in the preceding years, and stated that his party would not approve further funding for the firm until a clear recovery plan was tendered to Council. Opposition party, New Flemish Alliance (N-VA) accused Collins of a flip-flop. Collins justified his approach in public statements.

==== Ostend Citizen List OK controversy ====
A breakaway local political party OK, led by the former chairman of New Flemish Alliance (N-VA) Hendrik Wallijn in an interview in a national daily De Standaard of 20 September 2018 disclosed that unable to gather sufficient signatures to have their party registered for participation in the municipal election of 14 October 2018, outgoing Councillor Collins Nweke had come to their rescue by accepting to sign the relevant acts. Considering the Right-Wing roots of the new party, some of Collins Nweke's party colleagues and many Left-Wing supporters could not understand the rationale behind his decision. In a public statement issued on 24 September 2018, Collins Nweke admitted that he is no ideological bedfellow of the new party but that it is not about him. As a democrat he believes that the participation of the new party in the election is a deepening of the local democracy, a new choice for the citizens.

==== Nigerian Diaspora Policy controversy ====
Nweke faced criticism regarding his prolonged involvement in NIDO's leadership. Detractors accused him and his Diaspora associates maintaining control over the organisation for personal interests, leading to divisions within the Diaspora. In February 2024, in response to an open letter to newly appointed House Committee Chairman on Diaspora Affairs, which Nweke authored, he was heavily criticised Nweke doubled down on his policy advocacy insisting that Abike Dabiri as Chairperson can do more in constituting the Board of the Nigerians in Diaspora Commission (NiDCOM).

==== Ferry services ====
On 24 October 2014, Collins was the only councillor out of 41 who joined a consortium of civil society organisations for a trip to Ramsgate and Canterbury (United Kingdom) agitating for the resumption of ferry services between Ostend and England. In a statement on social media after the trip, he questioned the source of economic optimism of the City of Ramsgate and wondered why the mayor of Ostend was pessimistic about business prospects for the city.

=== 2014 campaign for Member of the European Parliament ===
After a successful primary election and selection as candidate, Collins Nweke began his campaign as Green Party candidate for Member European Parliament in February 2014 for the election of 25 May 2014. The focus of his campaign was on Poverty & Social Exclusion, Social Economy, Employment (special employment measures and policies), Internationalization, Energy Poverty, Solidarity Mechanisms, Africa Trade Relations and Effective human capital management. Nweke was not elected, winning 11,803 votes although his Green Party colleague, the incumbent member, Bart Staes, was re-elected. On 10 November 2014 Collins Nweke convened and inaugurated the Africa Social Policy Reform Summit at the European Parliament, hosted by Bart Staes.

=== National strike December 2014 ===
He participated in solidarity with trade unionists in the national strike of 15 December 2014 subsequently publishing an article Cutting Close to the Bones of Workers under his Socio-Economic Policy Briefing series on his website.

=== Other positions ===
Nweke is a member of the board of directors of Ostend's SOE, House of the Economy, Member Management Board, Tourism Board Ostend Member Advisory Board WestKans (Province of West Flanders) Bureau Accessibility Policy, of the Governing Board Equal Education Opportunities (GOK) for disadvantaged children, and of the Ostend Commission on Crime & Prevention.

== See also ==
- Green party
- Green politics
- List of environmental organizations
