= Claude Rolin =

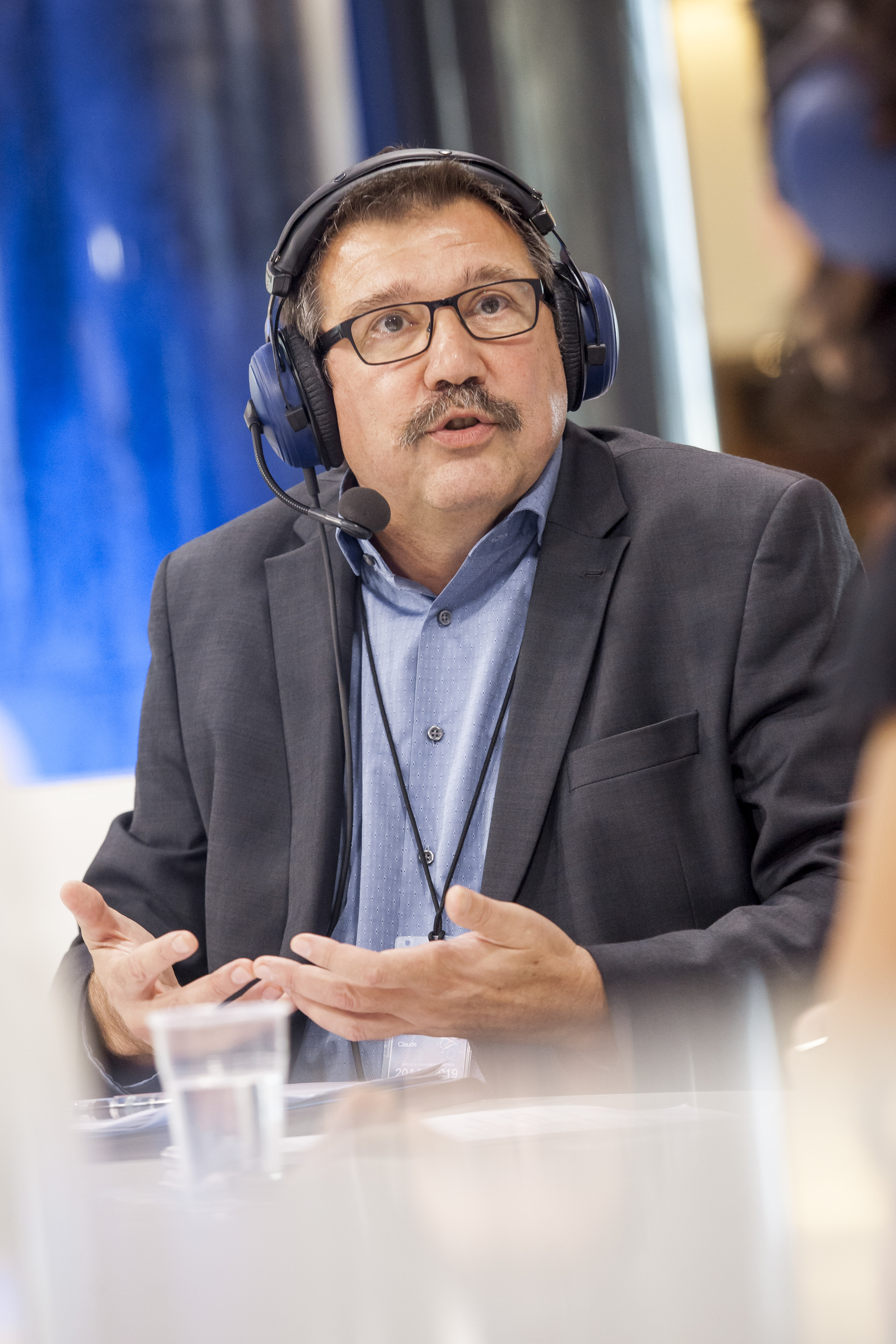

Member of the European Parliament
- Incumbent
- Assumed office 1 July 2014
- Constituency: Belgian French-speaking electoral college

Personal details
- Born: 26 May 1957 (age 68) Charleroi, Belgium
- Party: Humanist Democratic Centre (cdH)
- Occupation: Politician
- Website: clauderolin.eu

Claude Rolin (born 26 May 1957 in Charleroi) is a Belgian politician, who has been a Member of the European Parliament since 2014, representing the Belgian French-speaking electoral college. He is a member of the Humanist Democratic Centre (cdH), which sits in the EPP Group.

Rolin comes from Bertrix, in Belgian Luxembourg.

Prior to being MEP, Rolin was secretary of the Confederation of Christian Trade Unions (ACV/CSC). In addition to his committee assignments, he now serves as a member of the European Parliament Intergroup on Trade Unions.
