= Bart Staes =

Belgian politician

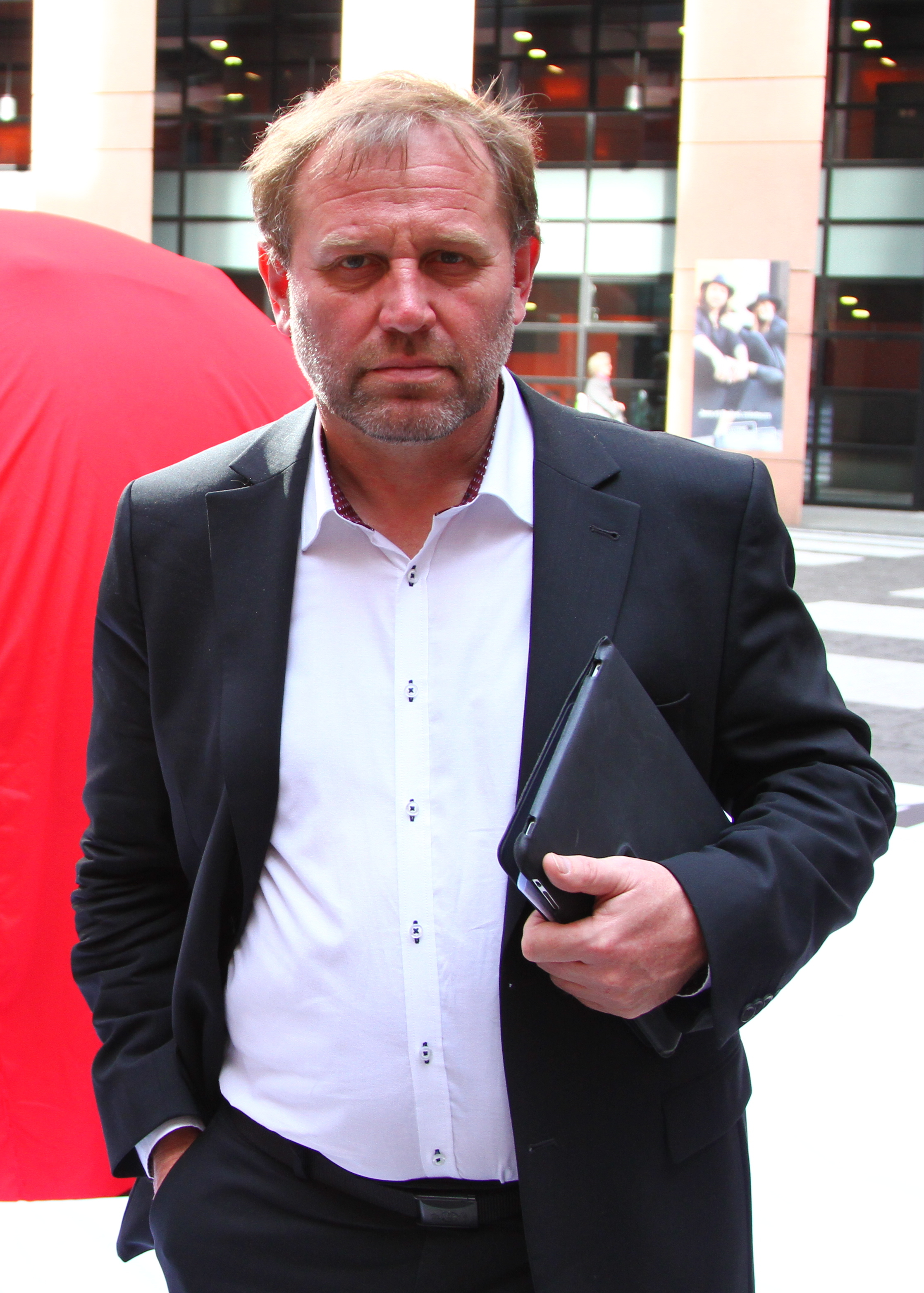

Member of the European Parliament
- In office 20 July 1999 – 2019

Personal details
- Born: 7 August 1958 (age 68) Izegem, Belgium
- Party: Volksunie; Groen (2002–)
- Education: Sint-Thomas Pedagogische Hogeschool, Brussels
- Occupation: Teacher, politician
- Website: Official website

Bart Hubert Wilfried Marcel Staes (Dutch pronunciation: [bɑrt ˈstaːs]; born 7 August 1958), is a Belgian politician who served as a Member of the European Parliament for Flanders from 1999 until 2019. He is a member of Groen, part of the European Greens.

After studying in Brussels and qualifying as a teacher (Dutch/English/Economics), Staes turned to politics, beginning his political career in the Volksunie, which later became Spirit. Following the formation of the electoral alliance (cartel) between Spirit and the Socialistische Partij Anders (sp.a) in 2002, Staes moved to join Agalev (as it was then known; today, Groen). He has been a Member of the European Parliament continuously since 1999, at first for the Volksunie, later Spirit and now Groen. His particular interests are the environment and peace movements.

== European Parliament ==
Staes was first elected into the European Parliament in 1999 and was reelected, as only member from his party, in 2004 and 2009. During his time in parliament, he was part of The Greens–European Free Alliance transnational political group together with MEPs for the GreenLeft. He served on the Committee on Budgetary Control and the Committee on the Environment, Public Health and Food Safety.

== Political career ==
His political career started with membership of the Volksunie. With the collapse of that party in 2002 he joined Agalev, as it was then known, now Groen. His party roles and Parliamentary service record include the following:

- Member Party Council VolksunieJongeren (1980–1981) and (1984–1987)
- Member of the VU-party-council (1984–1987) and (1995–2001)
- Second follower VU-senate list (1995–1999)
- Member Spirit-party presidency (2001–2002)
- Mandatory of Agalev/Groen (July 2002 - )
- Member of party council of Groen (2003 - )
- Member of European parliament (1999 - )
- Member of fraction Greens/European Free Alliance (Groenen/Europese Vrije Alliantie)
- Member of Budget Control Commission
- Instant member of Commission Environmental gestion, Public Health and Food security
- Member of Parliamentary cooperative commission EU-Russia
- Instant member of Parliamentary cooperative commission EU-Central-Asia
- Initiator of the Intergroup Chechnya
- Author of manifesto from the Gravensteengroep

=== Timeline ===
- 13 June 1999 – : Member of European Parliament

== Publications ==
- Published Het vlees is zwak with Jaak Vandemeulebroucke, Hadewijch, Antwerp, 1996
- Echo's voor een ander Europa, Houtekiet, Antwerp, 2004
- Voor een ander Europa, Houtekiet, Antwerp, 2009
- GGO's: Droom of werkelijkheid, Houtekiet, Antwerp, 2012
