= Leo Belgicus =

Cartographic symbol of the Low Countries

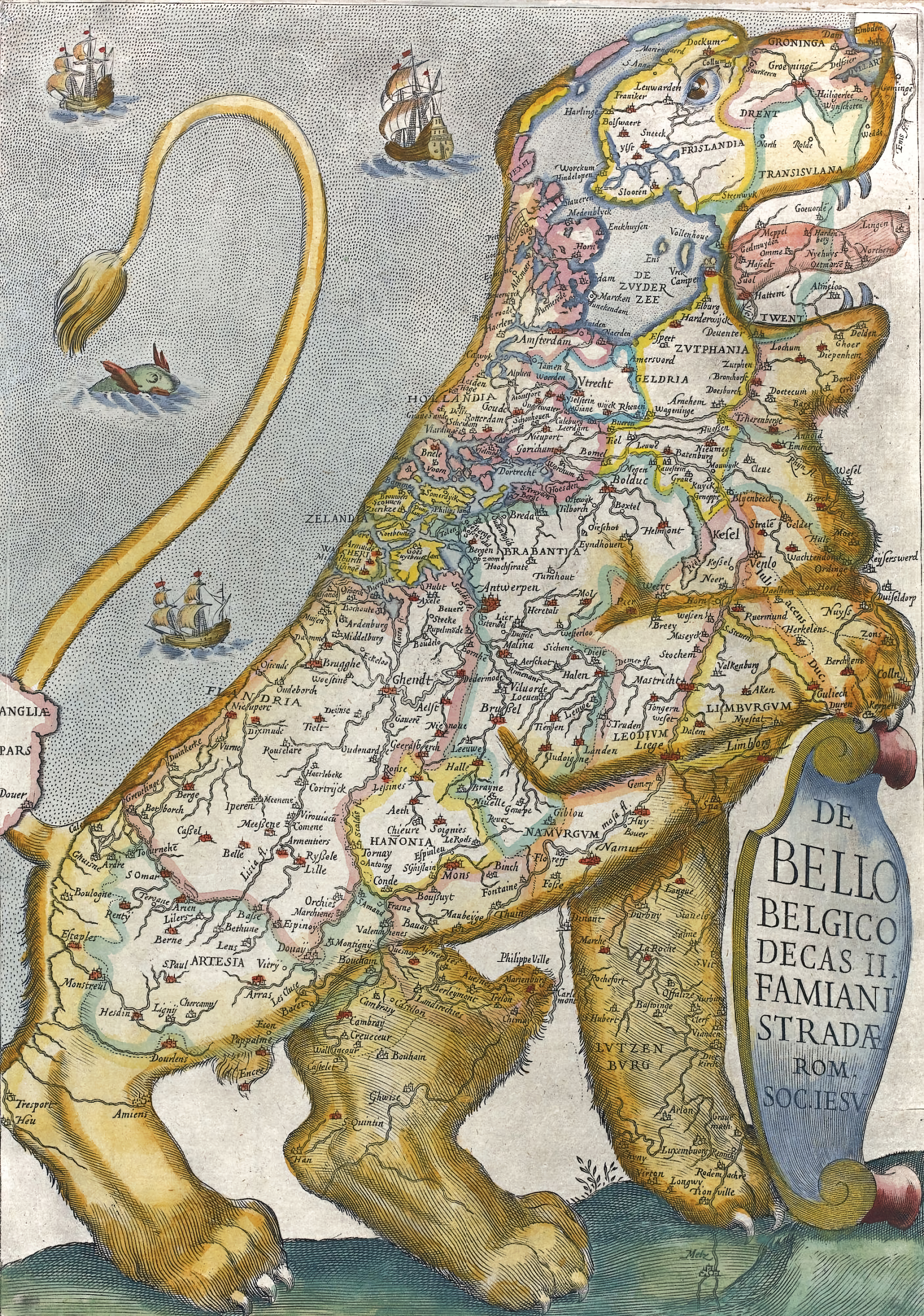
Title page of De Bello Belgico by Famiano Strada, 1647

The Leo Belgicus (Latin, 'Belgic Lion') was used in both heraldry and map design to symbolize the former Low Countries (current day Netherlands, Luxembourg, Belgium and a small part of northern France) with the shape of a lion.

When not in map form, the Leo Belgicus often accompanies the Dutch Maiden, the national personification of the Dutch Republic. Often both sit in a circular fenced enclosure, the "Garden of Holland".

Europa regina, showing Europe as a queen, was a comparable schematic.

The Leo Belgicus is also the name of the Belgian lion or the Brabantian lion, this lion is seen on the coat of arms of Belgium and the flag of the provinces of Flemish and Walloon Brabant.

== Terminology ==
The names derived from the Belgae (and thus including Belgica) are now mostly identified with the country Belgium; yet before the division of the Low Countries into a southern and a northern half in the 16th century, it was a common name for the entire Low Countries, and was the usual Latin translation of the Netherlands (which at that point covered the current territory of Belgium, Luxembourg, and a part of The Netherlands and northern France).

== History ==
The earliest Leo Belgicus was drawn by the Austrian cartographer Michaël Eytzinger in 1583, when the Netherlands were fighting the Eighty Years' War for independence. The motif was inspired by the heraldic figure of the lion, occurring in the coats of arms of several of the Netherlands, namely: Brabant, Flanders, Frisia, Guelders, Hainaut, Holland, Limburg, Luxembourg, Namur and Zeeland, as well as in those of William of Orange.

Eytzinger's map was the first of many. There were three different designs. In the most common one, the lion's head was located in the northeast of the country and the tail in the southeast. The most famous version is that of Claes Janszoon Visscher, which was published in 1609 on the occasion of the Twelve Years' Truce. A less common design reversed the position of the lion, as shown in the Leo Belgicus by Jodocus Hondius.

The third version was published in the later stages of the war, and after the independence of the Dutch Republic was confirmed in the Peace of Westphalia (1648). It is called the Leo Hollandicus, the Holland Lion, and shows only the province of Holland. One of the earliest versions was published by Visscher around 1625.

== Maps of the Leo Belgicus ==
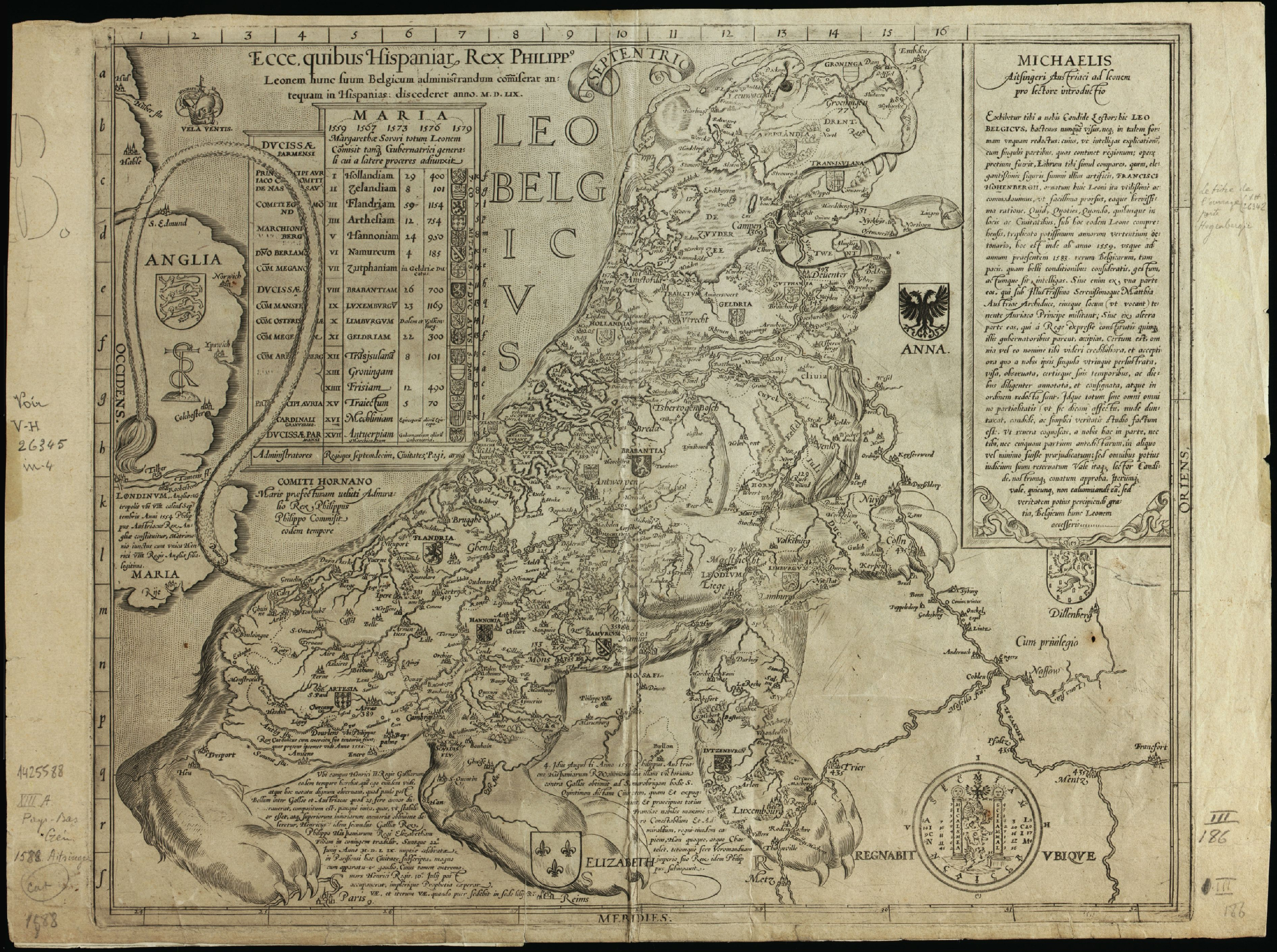
Leo Belgicus by Aitsinger/Hogenberg, 1583

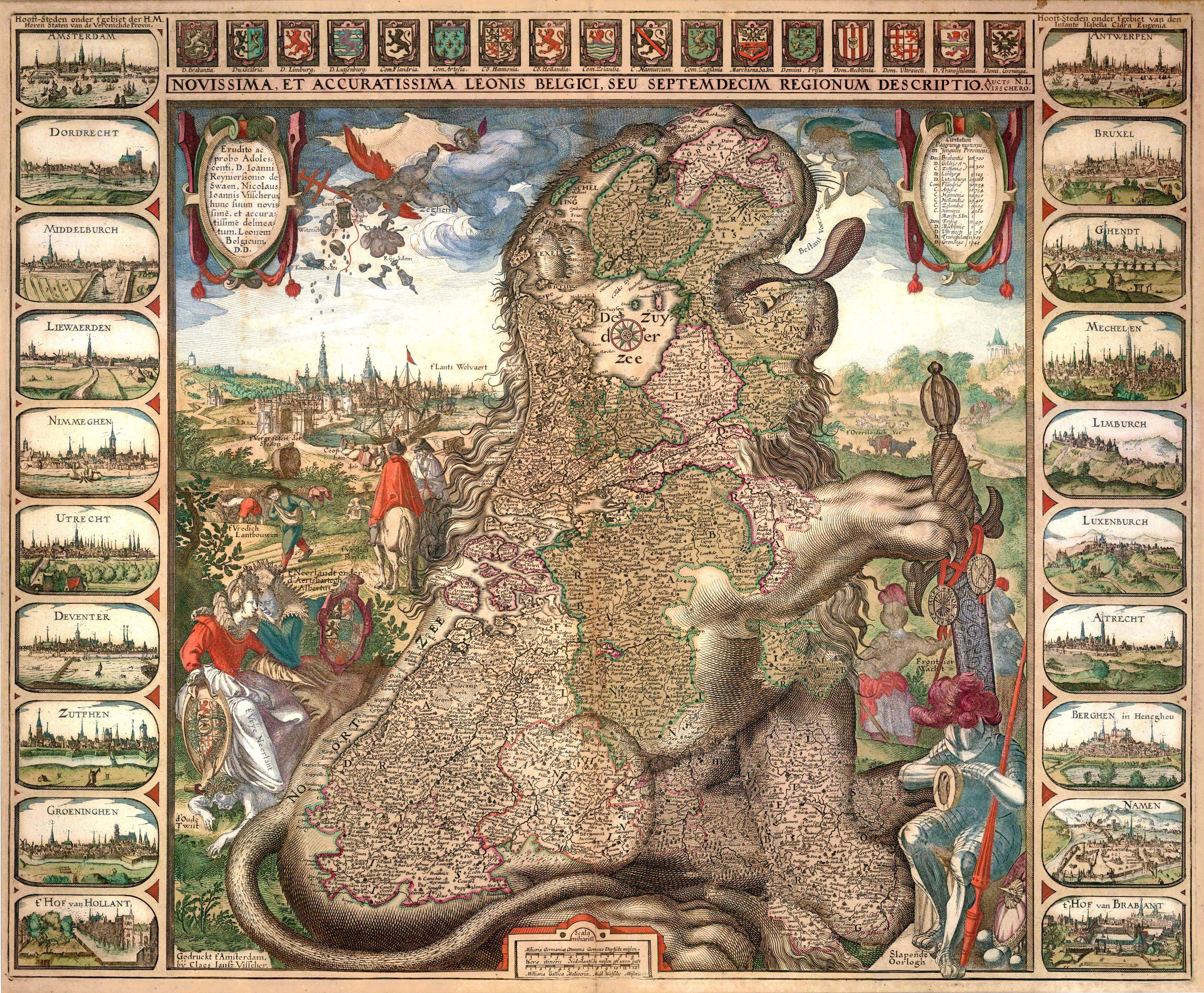
Leo Belgicus by Claes Janszoon Visscher, 1611

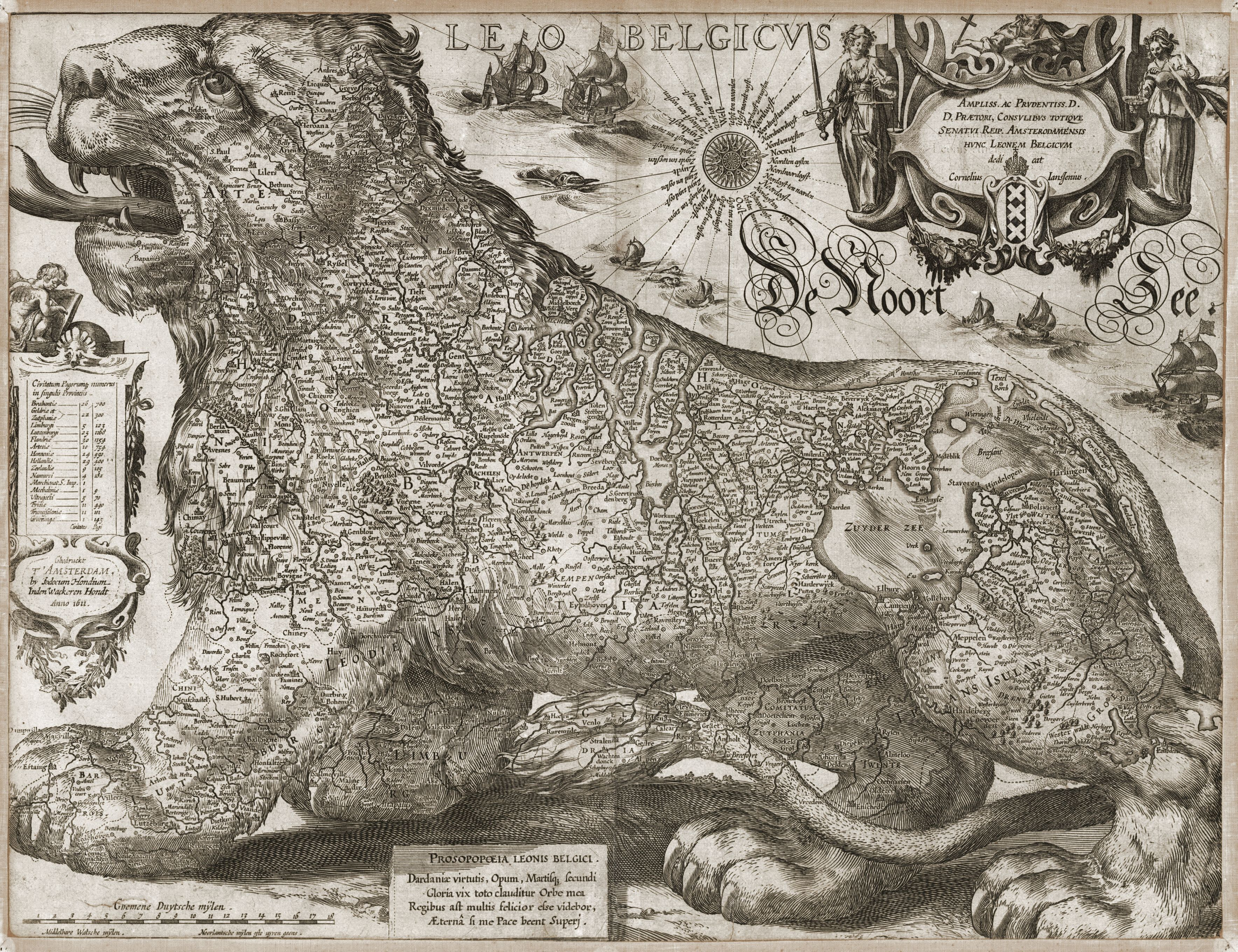
Leo Belgicus by Jodocus Hondius, 1611

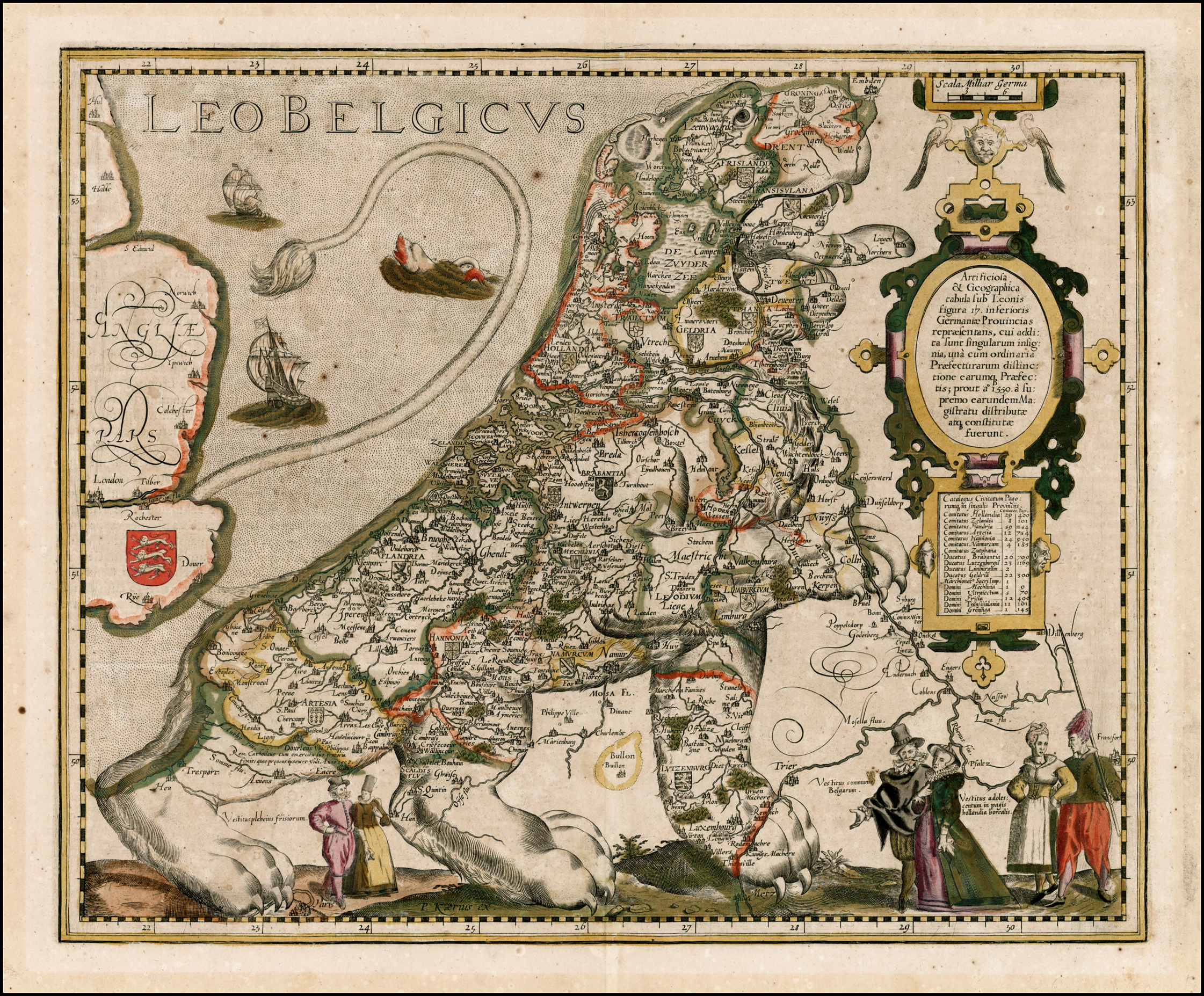
Leo Belgicus by Kaerius (vd Keere), 1617

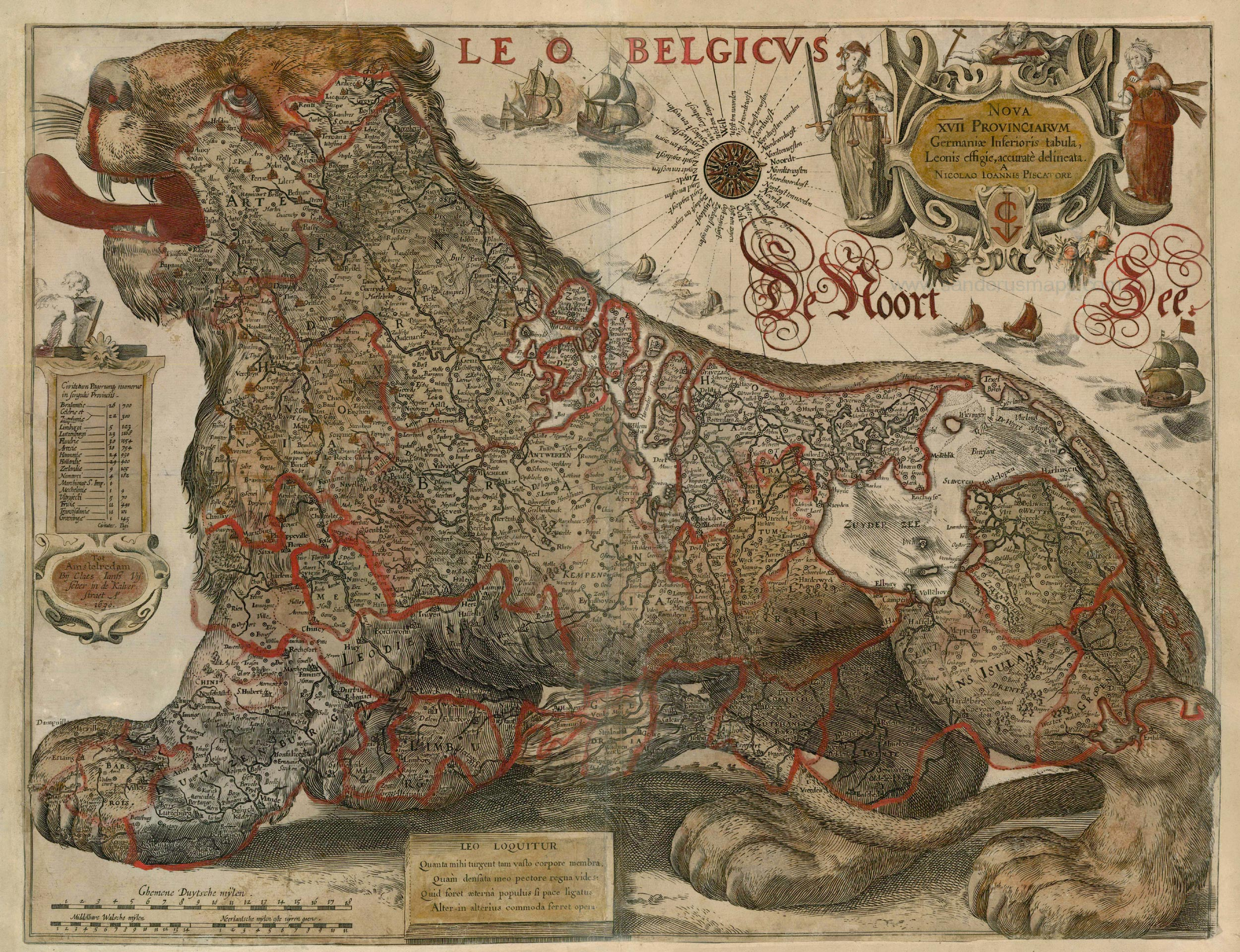
Leo Belgicus by Hondius & Gerritsz, 1630

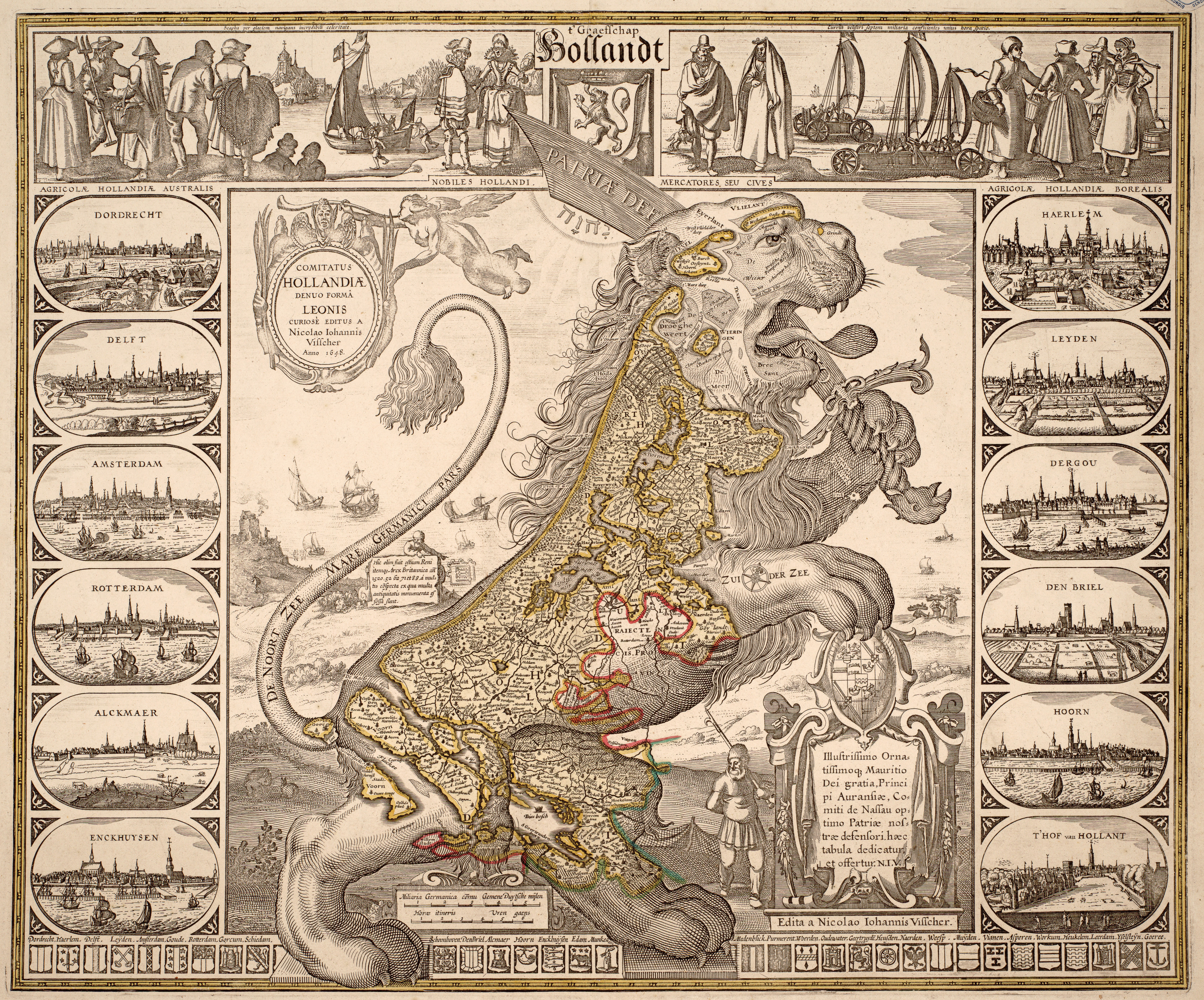
Leonis Hollandiae by Visscher 1648

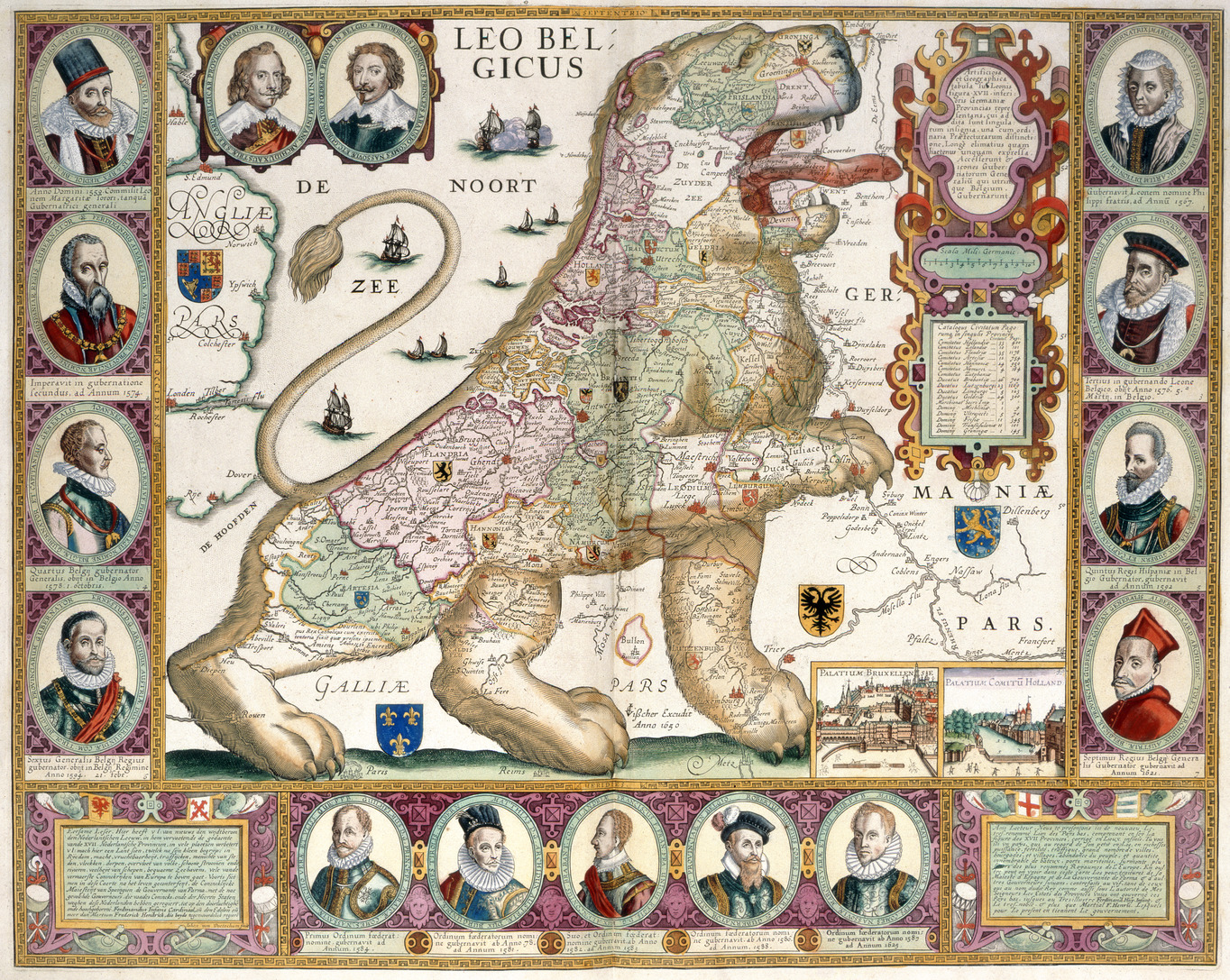
Leo by Visscher, 1650

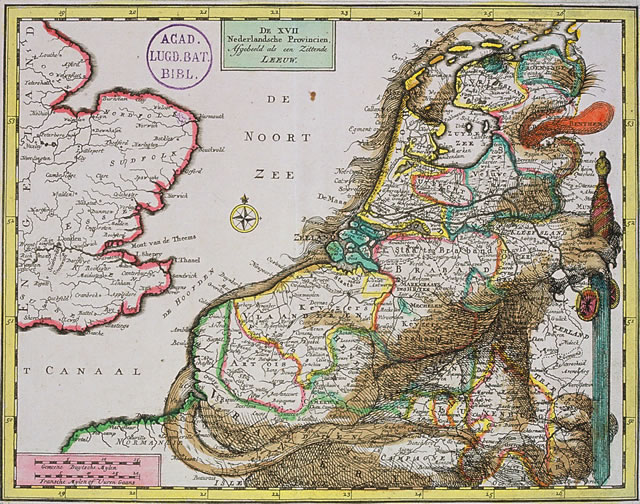
Leo by Schenk 1707

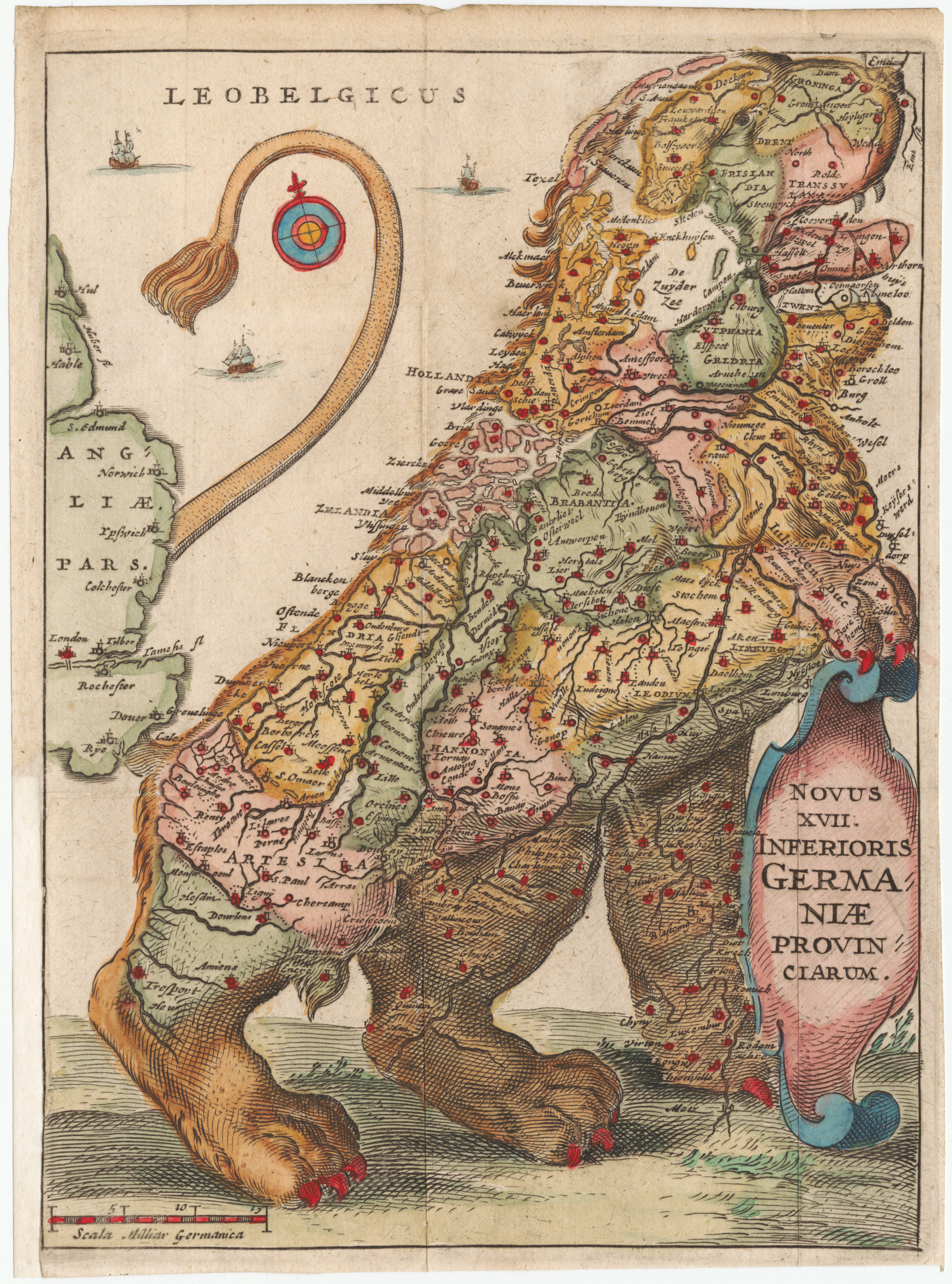
A Leo Belgicus map by Famiano Strada, 1648

== See also ==
- Leo Belgicus (heraldry)
- Coat of arms of Belgium
- Belgian heraldry
- Dutch Republic Lion
