= Atlas der Neederlanden =

Book

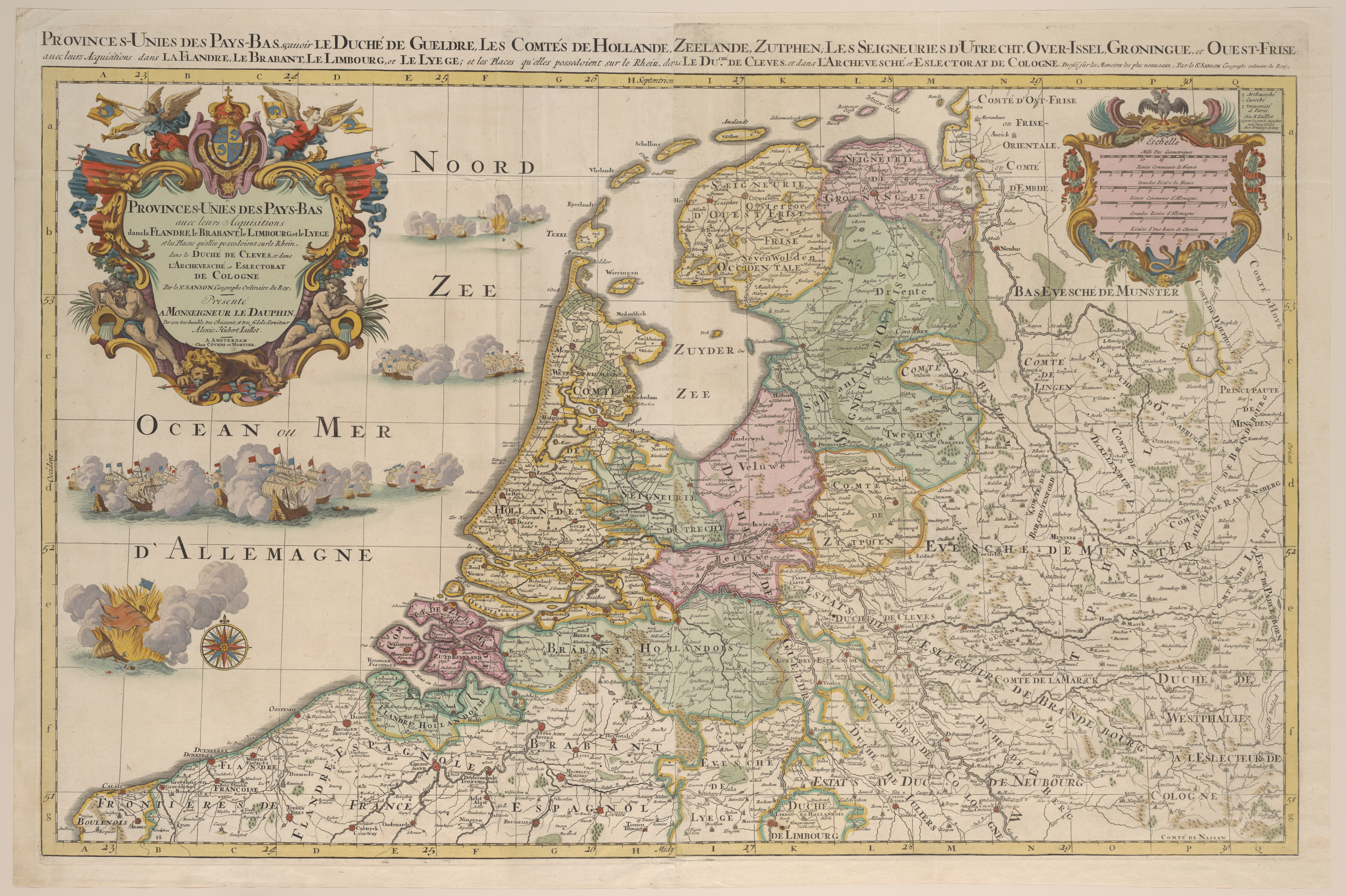
- Map of the Dutch Republic, created by Nicolas Sanson (1600-1667) and published in Amsterdam by Covens and Mortier in around 1730.
- Subject: Cartography
- Genre: Composite atlas
- Publisher: [Presumably Covens and Mortier]
- Publication date: Around 1816
- Publication place: Netherlands
- Pages: 9 volumes
- Media related to Atlas der Neederlanden at Wikimedia Commons

The Atlas der Neederlanden, or Atlas of the Netherlands, is a composite atlas which was presumably collected and composed by the publishing company Covens and Mortier in Amsterdam. The maps are gathered in nine volumes and show how the Low Countries, including Belgium and the former colonies of the Netherlands, have developed over the course of about two decades. The atlas contains more than 600 printed and manuscript maps and is preserved by the Special Collections of the University of Amsterdam.

== Composite atlas ==
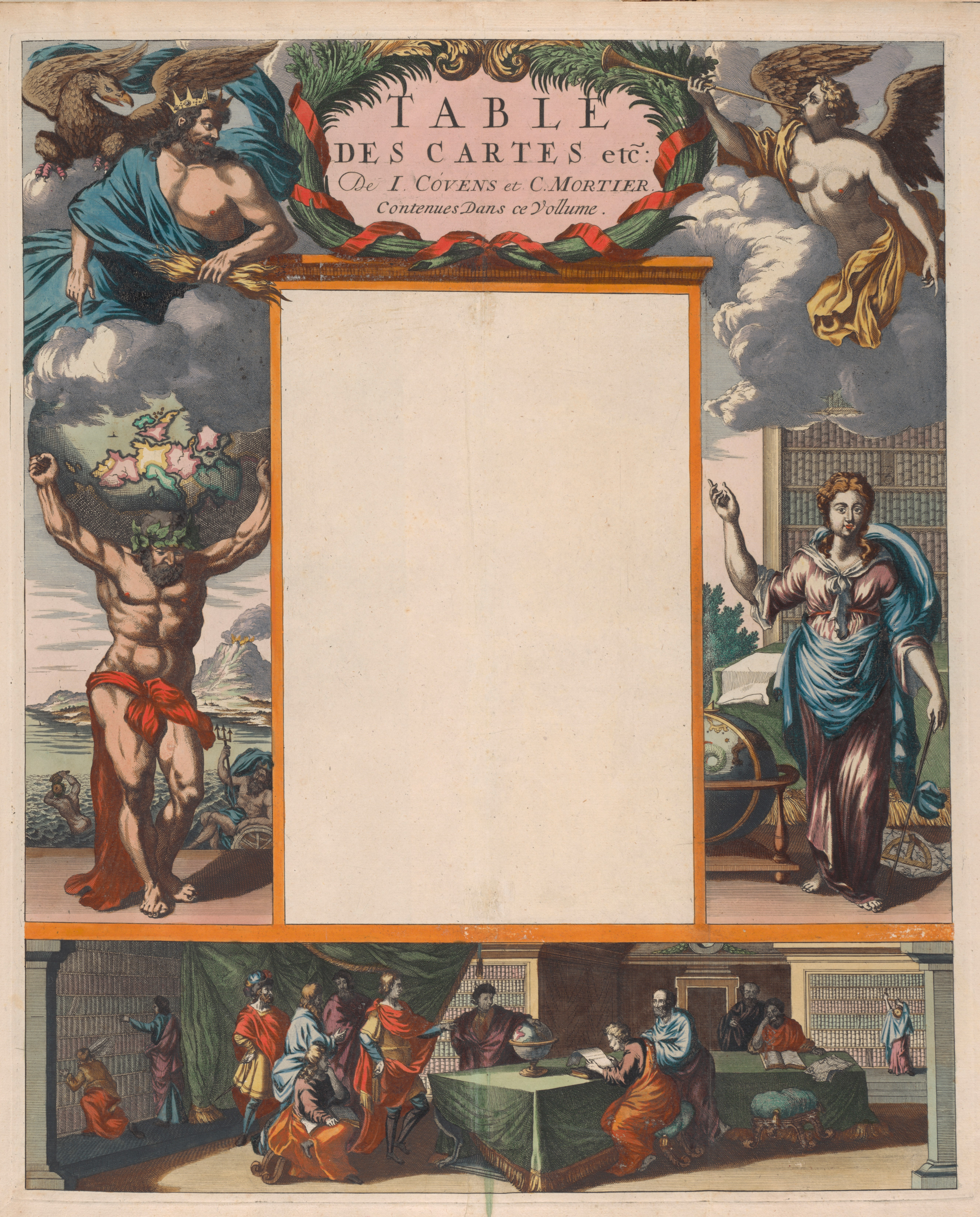
Frontispiece from the publishing company Covens and Mortier.

The Atlas der Neederlanden is an atlas factice, also known as composite atlas. These atlases were composed by wealthy people who collected maps concerning a specific region or topic. In some cases rich buyers contracted the publisher to collect the maps for them. These maps were then bound together in one or more volumes by a book binder in the typical "atlas-binding". Each composite atlas contains a different collection of maps and is therefore unique in its composition. There are different composite atlases preserved, for example the Atlas Blaeu-Van der Hem in the Austrian National Library in Vienna and the Atlas Van der Hagen, which was made earlier than the Atlas der Neederlanden, around 1690, and has been in the possession of the National Library of the Netherlands since 1887.

== History ==
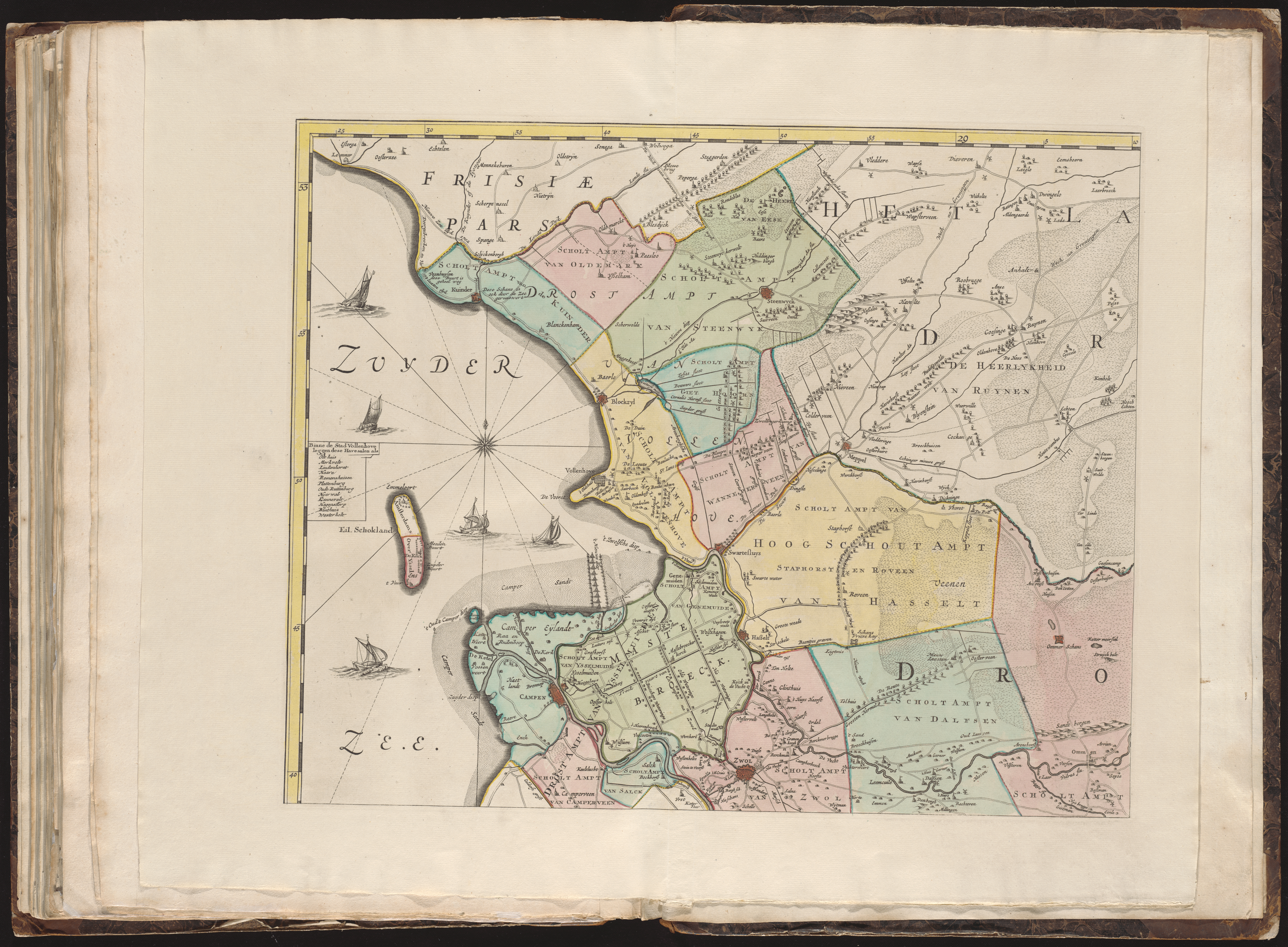
Map of the northern part of Overijssel (1743).

Who the collector of the Atlas der Neederlanden was or for whom it was made remains unclear. At some point in the 19th century the book found its way to the University of Amsterdam where it is now part of the Special Collections of its University Library. It is assumed that the atlas was composed by Covens and Mortier. The publisher is mentioned at the frontispieces of eight of the nine volumes with the following text: Table des cartes etc: de I. Cóvens et C. Mortier contenues dans ce volume. Also, most of the maps in the atlas were published by Covens and Mortier.

When the last volume of the atlas was finished around 1816, the publishing house was led by Cornelis Covens (1764-1825). He worked for his family's firm from 1790 until 1825, bringing it innovation and success. Covens and Mortier published many new maps but also kept the old stock, which ensured that the firm had a large fund of maps. Within the field of commercial and government cartography Covens and Mortier became the leading publishing company at the beginning of the 19th century.

Around 1816 the last volume of the atlas was finished. The largest part of the map collection dates from the 18th century. A few maps originate from the 17th century, like the Leo Belgicus dating from 1611 and a map of the Netherlands created by Frederik de Wit in 1670. Most of the 18th century maps are collected in volumes 1-8. Volume 9 contains maps from the 17th century and a few maps dating from the beginning of the 19th century. This volume doesn't have a frontispiece of the publisher. The most recent maps in the atlas are to be found in volume 9 and date from 1816.

== Map collection ==
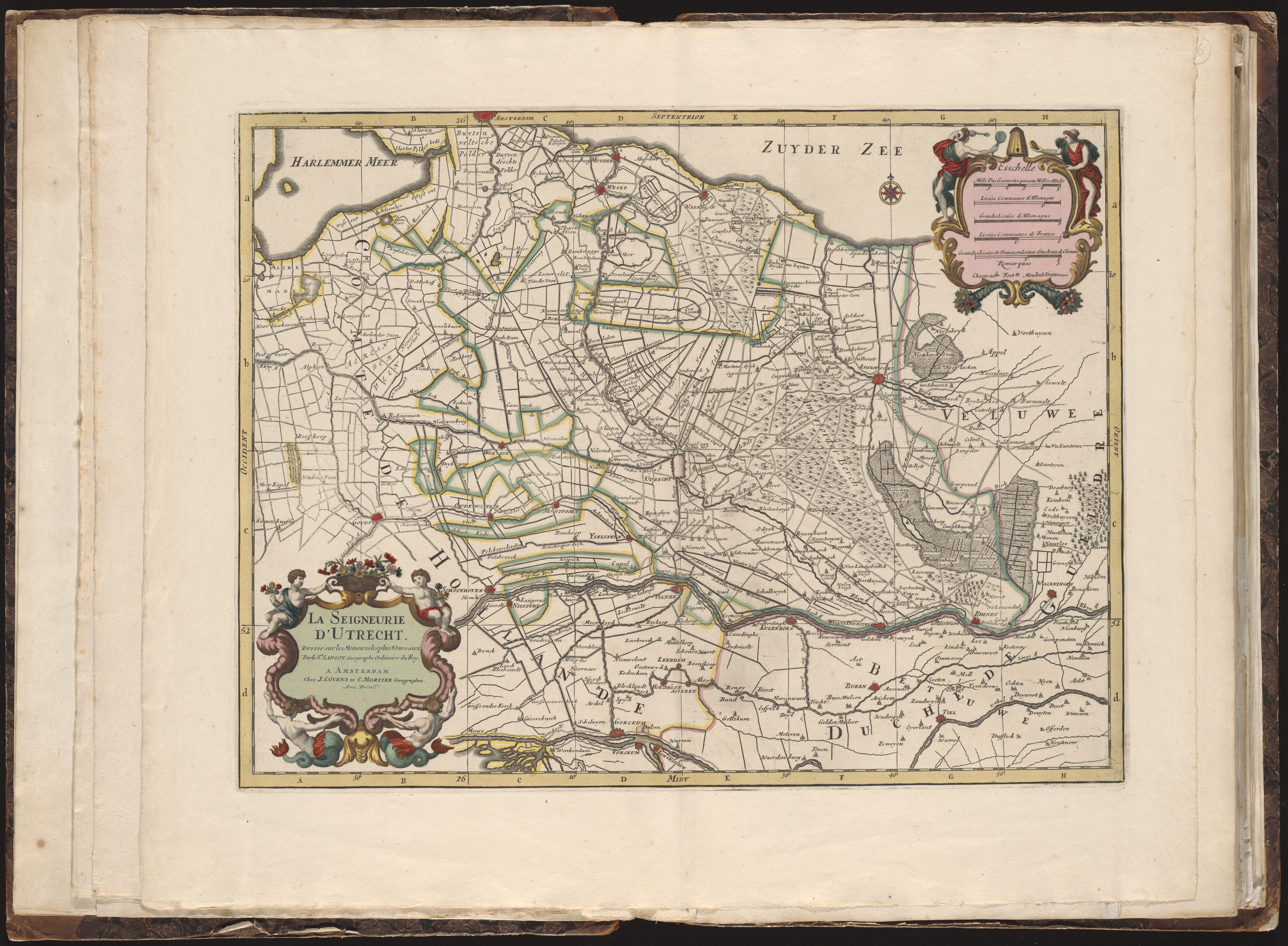
Map of Utrecht (second quarter of the 18th century).

40-sheet wall map of Holland created by Jacob Aertsz Colom. The sheets were bound separately.

The Atlas der Neederlanden contains maps of large sizes. Most atlases from the 17th and 18th century do not have large maps because these didn't fit in the bound volumes. The Atlas der Neederlanden forms an exception. The large-scale maps were folded to fit in the atlas and several wall maps of 4, 12 and 25 sheets were bound separately. The multi-sheet wall maps were popular decorations and therefore rarely preserved well. Because the separate sheets were bound and kept in the atlas, they remained in good condition with their lively colours still preserved.

The atlas has nine volumes. Each volume is about a different part of the Netherlands:

- Volume I: Gelderlandt, Utrecht & Over Yssel (Gelderland, Utrecht and Overijssel)
- Volume II: Holland 1. Zuid-Holland (South Holland)
- Volume III: Holland 2. Zuid-Holland (South Holland)
- Volume IV: Holland 3. Zuid-Holland (South Holland)
- Volume V: Holland 4. Noord-Holland (North Holland)
- Volume VI: Zeeland (Zeeland)
- Volume VII: Vriesland, Groningen & Drenthe (Friesland, Groningen and Drenthe)
- Volume VIII: Belgiën (Belgium)
- Volume IX: Algemeene kaarten & Coloniën (General maps and colonies)

== Restoration ==
In 2011 the atlas was restored and digitized. A facsimile edition has been made of the nine volumes. This facsimile was presented at the celebration of the 200 year commemoration of the Kingdom of the Netherlands in 2013. The facsimile was published together with the book De Atlas der Neederlanden: Kaarten van de Republiek en het prille Koninkrijk met 'Belgiën' en 'Coloniën'.

== Maps on Wikimedia Commons ==
See also the Wikimedia Commons page Atlas der Neederlanden.

The Special Collections of the University of Amsterdam has made all the scans of the Atlas der Neederlanden available on Wikimedia Commons.

== See also ==
- Early modern Netherlandish cartography
