= Coat of arms of Belgium =

- Greater version (French version of motto)

Versions
- Middle version (French version of motto)

- Lesser version (French version of motto)
- Armiger: Kingdom of Belgium
- Adopted: 17 March 1837
- Crest: A helmet with raised visor or crowned with a Royal Crown of Belgium
- Shield: Sable, a lion rampant or, armed and langued Gules with two crossed sceptres (a hand of justice and a lion) or behind a shield. The grand collar of the Order of Leopold (Belgium) surrounds the shield
- Supporters: Two lions guardant proper each supporting a lance Gules point or with two National Flags of Belgium (Tierced per pale Sable, or and Gules).
- Compartment: Underneath the compartment is placed the ribbon Gules with two stripes Sable charged with the motto
- Motto: French: L'union fait la force Dutch: Eendracht maakt macht German: Einigkeit macht stark "Unity makes strength"
- Order: Order of Leopold
- Other elements: The whole is placed on a mantle Gules with ermine lining, fringes and tassels Or and ensigned with the Royal Crown of Belgium. Above the mantle rise banners with the arms of the nine provinces that constituted Belgium in 1837. They are (from dexter to sinister) Antwerp, West Flanders, East Flanders, Liège, Brabant, Hainaut, Limburg, Luxembourg and Namur

The coat of arms of Belgium bears a lion or, known as Leo Belgicus (Latin for the Belgian lion), as its charge. This is in accordance with article 193 (originally 125) of the Belgian Constitution: The Belgian nation takes red, yellow and black as colours, and as state coat of arms the Belgian lion with the motto UNITY MAKES STRENGTH. A royal decree of 17 March 1837 determines the achievement to be used in the greater and the lesser version, respectively.

== History ==
The newly independent Kingdom of Belgium decided to base its coat of arms and flag on the symbols used by the short-lived United Belgian States. These came into being after the Southern Netherlands threw off Austrian rule. It existed as an independent polity from January to December 1790. The Duchy of Brabant had taken the lead in the so-called Brabant Revolution, the insurrection against Emperor Joseph II, and afterwards dominated the United Netherlandish States. Therefore, the Lion of Brabant (sable, a lion rampant or, armed and langued gules) came to stand for the entire federation.

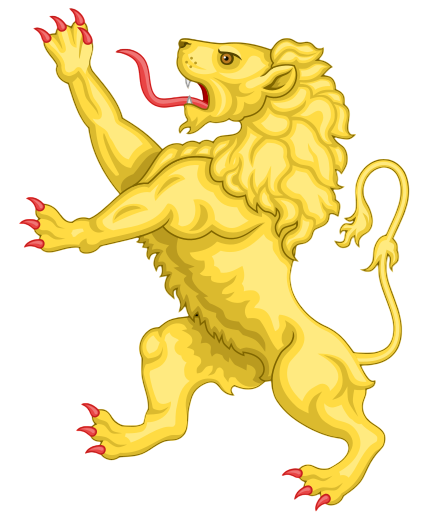
Leo Belgicus (Belgian lion) used on the (current) official coat of arms of Belgium

This was not without precedent. In the course of the Dutch Revolt the provinces rebelling against the rule of King Philip II adopted a common seal in 1578 showing the Leo Belgicus wearing a crown and holding a sword and a sheaf of arrows. The crown stood for sovereignty, the sword for the war against Spain and the arrows for the concord and unity among the rebellious provinces. At first the lion of the (Dutch) Republic of the United Provinces had the Brabant colours or on sable. It was only when most of Brabant was reconquered by Spain in the 1580s and Holland came to dominate the Republic, that the colours of the Dutch lion (or and gules) became the definitive tinctures of the arms of the United Provinces. The Dutch Revolt likewise provided the motto "Unity Makes Strength". The inscription of the seal of 1578 reads Concordia res parvae crescunt (through unity small things grow), a quote taken from Sallust's Jugurthine War. Soon Dutch sources used the translation Eendracht maekt magt. The United States of Belgium of 1790 used the Latin version In Unione Salus. Their motto was in turn taken over and translated into French by the Kingdom of Belgium in 1831. It was only in 1958 that it was decided that the official Dutch translation should read Eendracht maakt macht.

== Coat of arms of Belgium ==
coat of arms of Belgium (Great)

coat of arms of Belgium (Middle)

coat of arms of Belgium (state/small)

coat of arms of Belgium (shield)

== Historical coat of arms of Belgium ==
Coat of arms of the County of Flanders (863–1794)

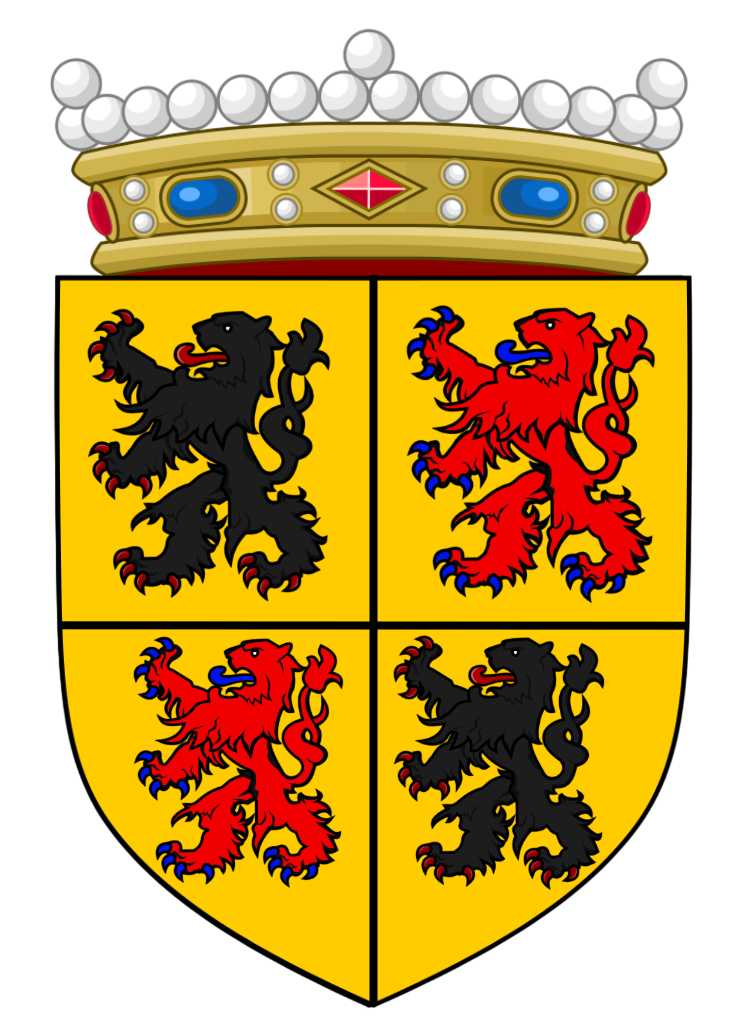
Coat of arms of the County of Hainaut (900–1477)

Coat of Arms of Lower Lotharingia (959–1190)

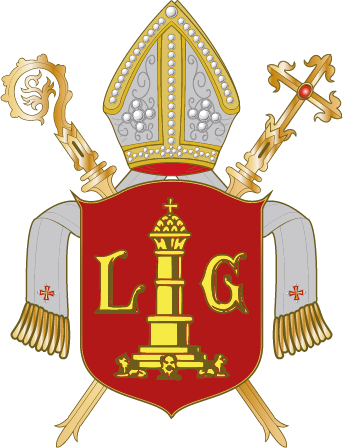
Coat of arms of the Prince-Bishopric of Liège (980–1790)

Coat of arms of the County of Namur (981–1797)

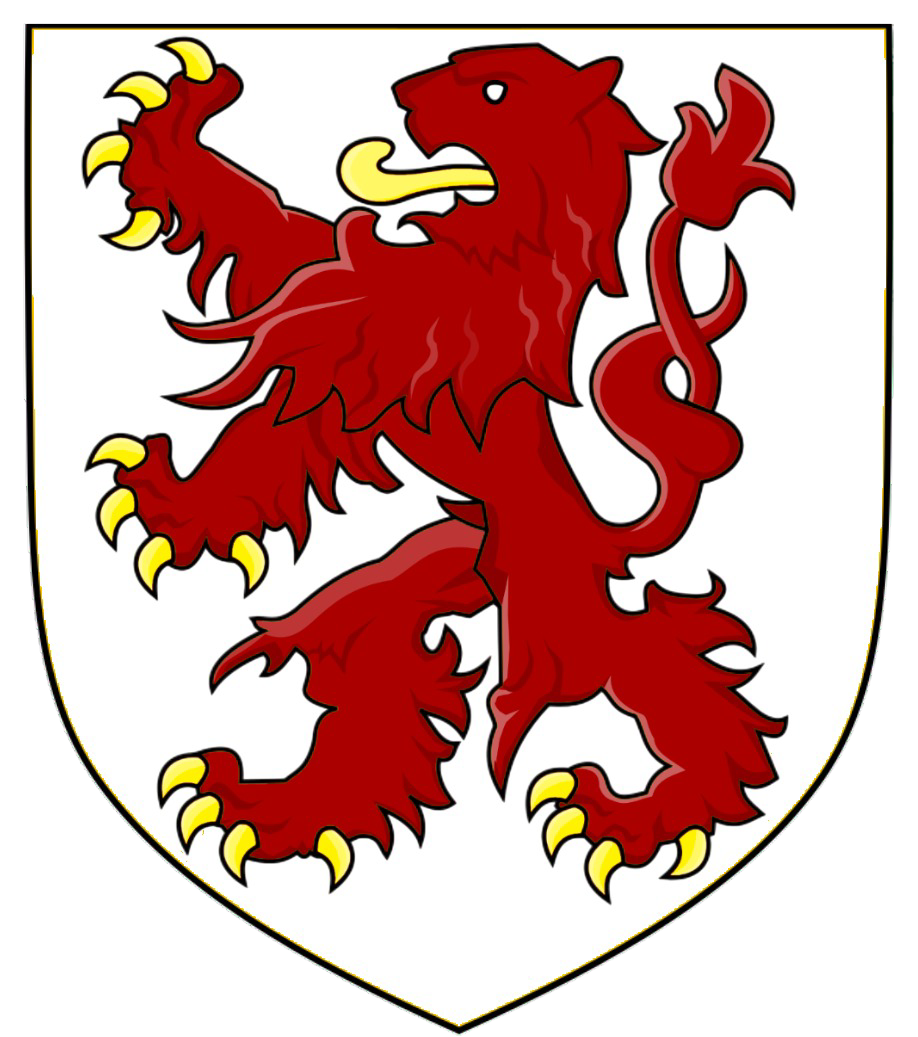
Coat of arms of the Duchy of Limburg (1065–1797)

Coat of arms of the Duchy of Brabant (1183–1794)

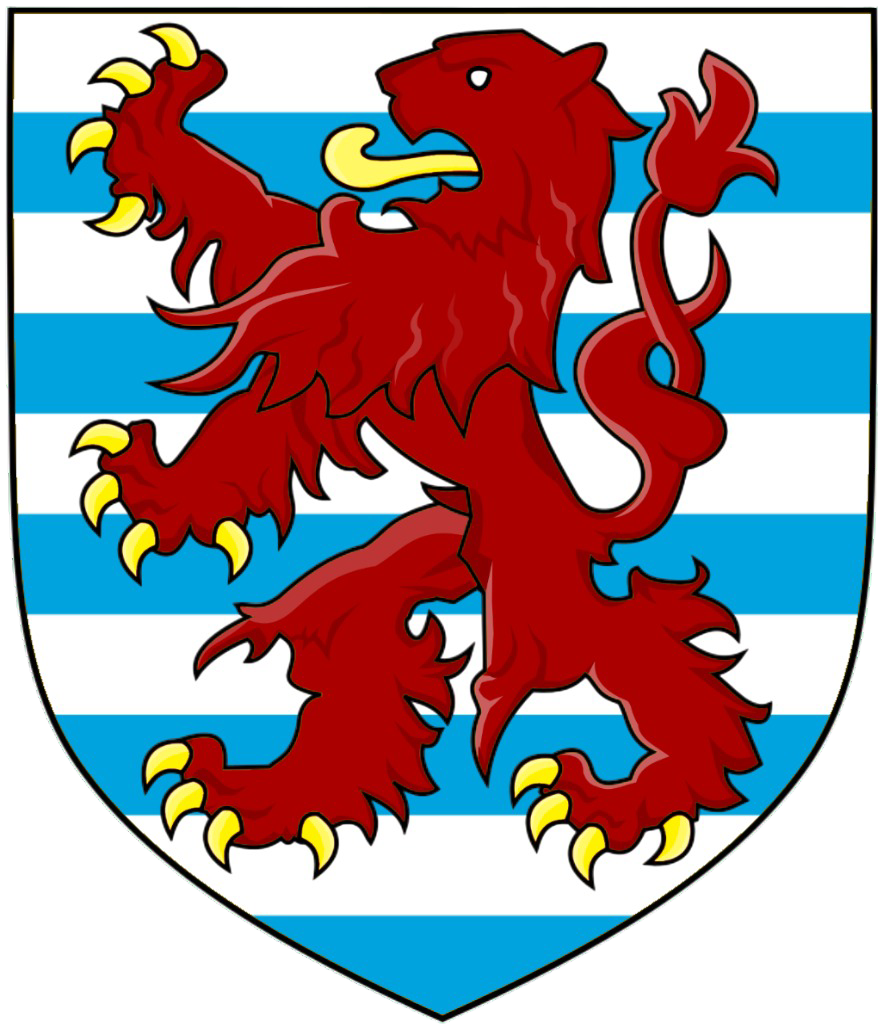
Coat of arms of the Duchy of Luxembourg (1353–1797)

Coat of arms of the Burgundian State (1384–1482)

Coat of arms of the Habsburg Netherlands (1482–1797)

Coat of arms of the Spanish Netherlands (1556–1714)

Coat of arms of the Austrian Netherlands (1714–1797)

Coat of arms of United Belgian States (1789–1790)

Coat of arms of the United Kingdom of the Netherlands (1815–1830)

Coat of arms of Belgium (1830–now)

== Colonial coat of arms of Belgium ==
Coat of arms of the Congo Free State (1885-1907)

Coat of arms of the Belgian Congo (1908–1960)

Coat of arms of the Belgian Congo (1908–1960)

Coat of arms of Belgian Ruanda-Urundi (1916–1962)

Coat of arms of the Lado Enclave (1894–1910)

Coat of arms of the Belgian concession of Tianjin (1902–1931)

== Other coats of arms of Belgium ==
coat of arms of the City of Brussels (1817–now)

Coat of arms of The Neutral Moresnet (1816–1921)

Coat of arms of the Belgian Ostend Company(1722–1731)

Coat of arms of the Council of Heraldry and Vexillology, Flanders (1985–now)

Coat of arms of the Council of Heraldry and Vexillology, Wallonia (1985–now)

== Leo Belgicus (Belgian lion) ==
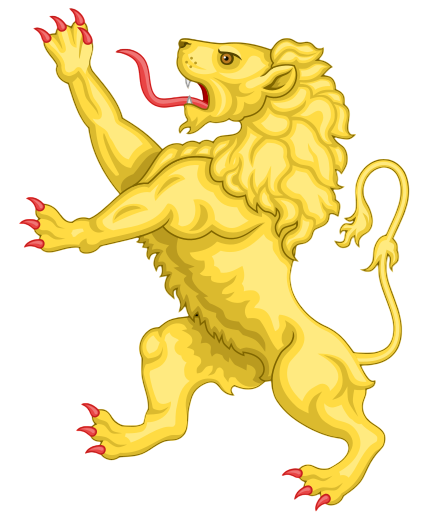
Leo Belgicus (Lion used on the coat of arms of Belgium)

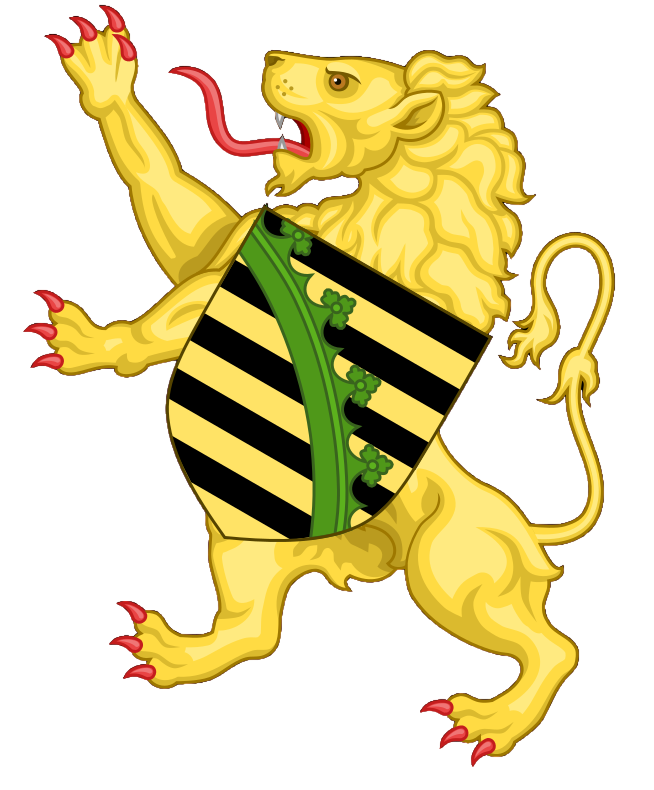
Leo Belgicus with the coat of arms of the Royal house of Saxe-Coburg and Gotha.

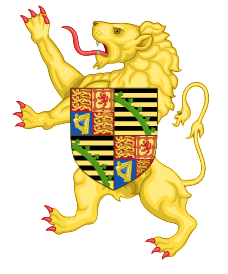
Leo Belgicus used by King Leopold I of Belgium on his personal coat of arms

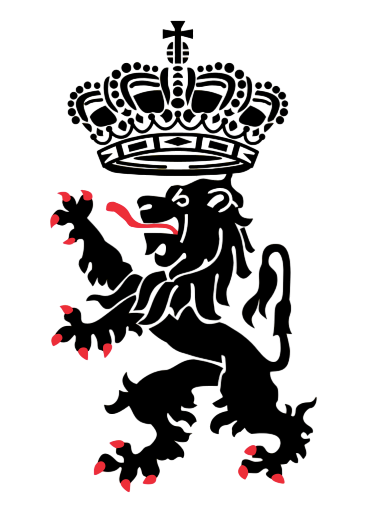
Lion used by the Belgian (federal) government

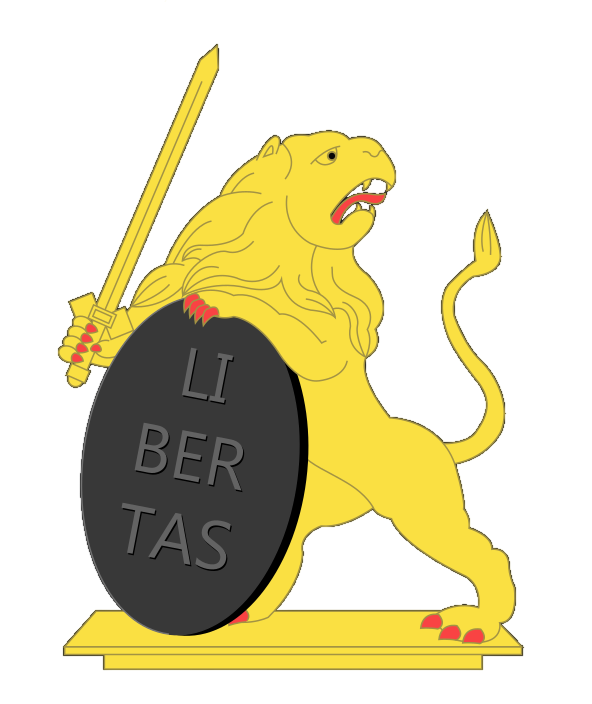
Leo Belgicus of the United Belgian States

Leo Belgicus of the Duchy of Brabant and Belgicism

== Variants of the Belgian coat of arms ==
=== Greater version ===
The shield is emblazoned: Sable, a lion rampant or, armed and langued gules. It is surmounted by a helmet with raised visor, with mantling or and sable and the royal crown in lieu of a crest. Behind the shield are placed a hand of justice and a sceptre with a lion. The grand collar of the Order of Leopold surrounds the shield. Two lions guardant proper support the shield as well as a lance with the national colours black, yellow and red. Underneath the compartment is placed the motto L'union fait la force in French or Eendracht maakt macht in Dutch, or Unity Is Strength in English. The riband of the motto is red, with black stripes on either side. The lettering is golden.

Since the Royal Decree of 1837 never received an official translation, the use of the Dutch version of the motto is customary rather than official. The whole is placed on a red mantle with ermine lining and golden fringes and tassels, ensigned with the royal crown. Above the mantle rise banners with the arms of the nine provinces that constituted Belgium in 1837. They are (from dexter to sinister) Antwerp, West Flanders, East Flanders, Liège, Brabant, Hainaut, Limburg, Luxembourg and Namur.

Coat of arms of Belgium (greater)

Coat of arms of Belgium (variant with all 10 provinces)

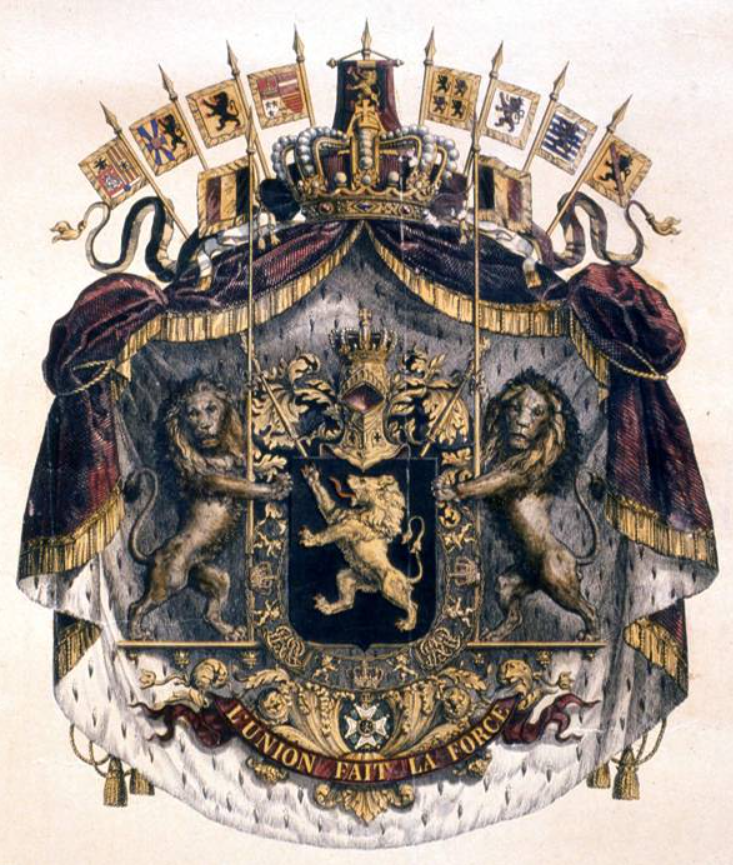
Greater Belgian coat of arms in article 125 of the constitution (1837)

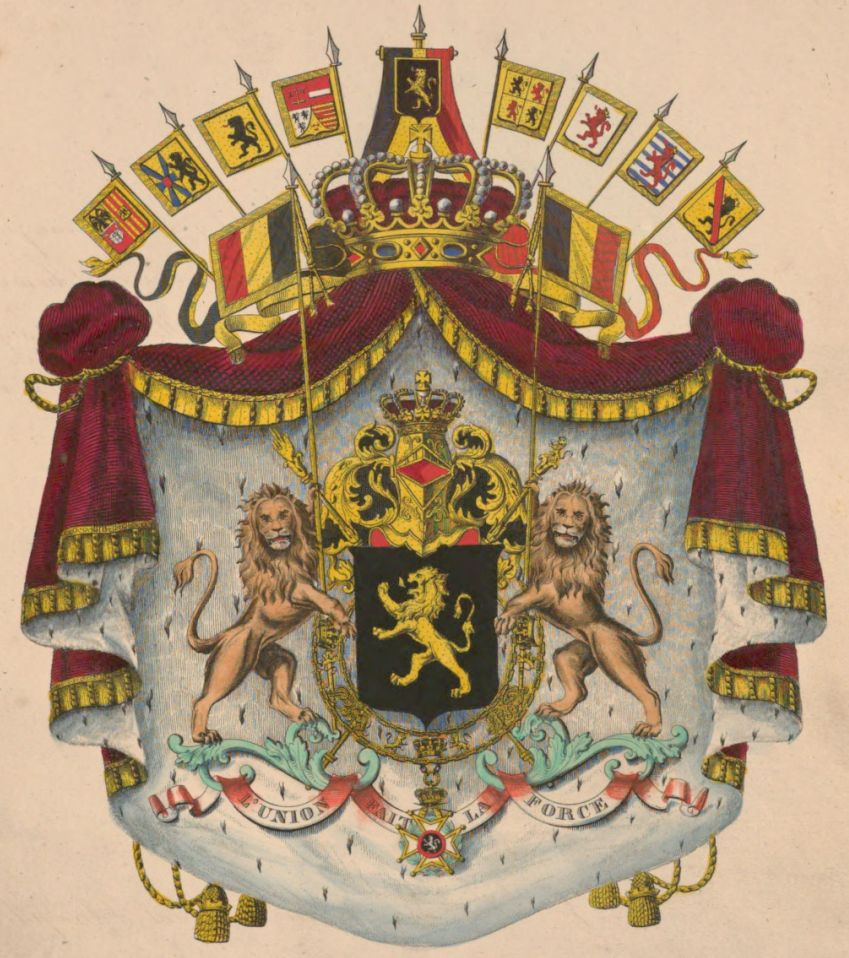
Greater coat of arms Belgium (19th century)

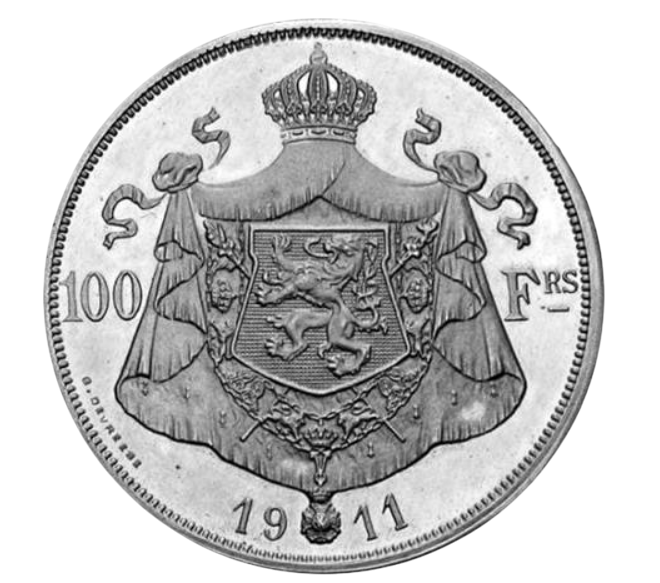
Greater Belgian coat of arms on a coin

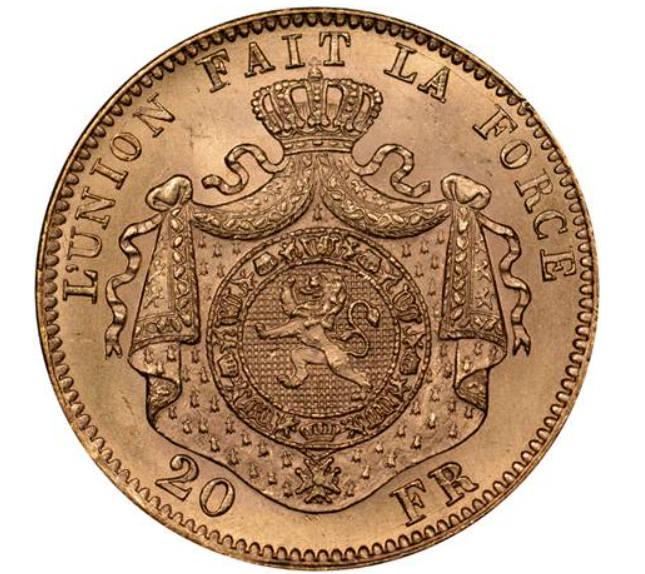
Greater (Circular) coat of arms of Belgium on a coin

The greater arms are used only rarely. They adorn the great seal that is affixed to laws and international treaties.

Since the province of Brabant was split into Flemish Brabant, Walloon Brabant and Brussels in 1995, the greater arms no longer reflect the present territorial divisions of the state. The changes made to the arms of the Flemish provinces as a result of this decision are not reflected in the great seal either.

=== Lesser version ===
The lesser coat of arms (as used by the Belgian federal government, on passport covers and the official sites of the monarchy and of the government) consists of the shield, the royal crown, the crossed sceptres, the collar of the Order of Leopold and the motto.

Coat of arms of Belgium (Lesser/State)

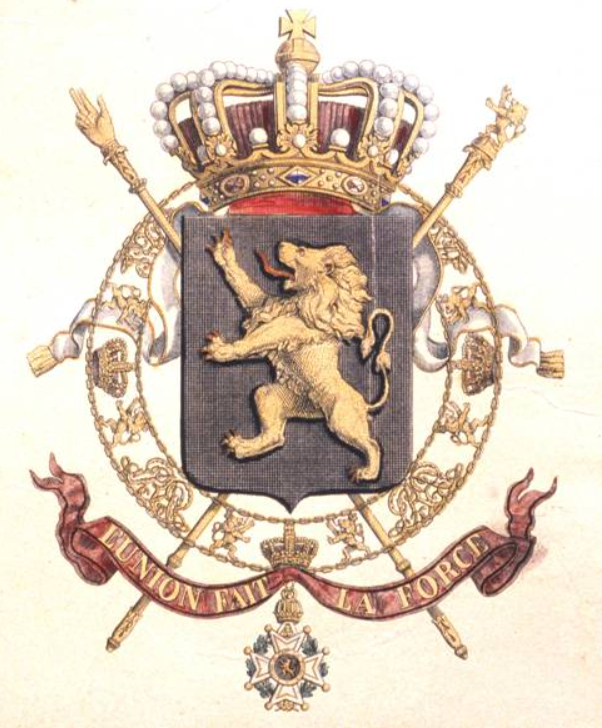
Belgian lesser coat of arms in the constitution

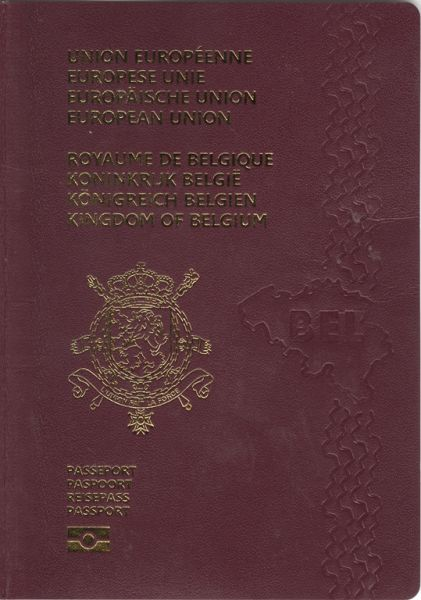
Lesser arms on a Belgian passport cover

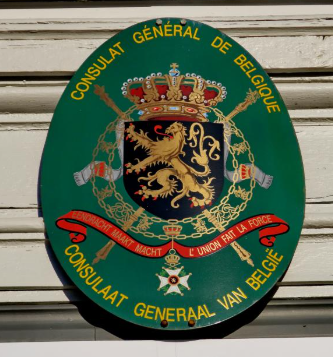
Lesser coat of arms on an embassy plaque

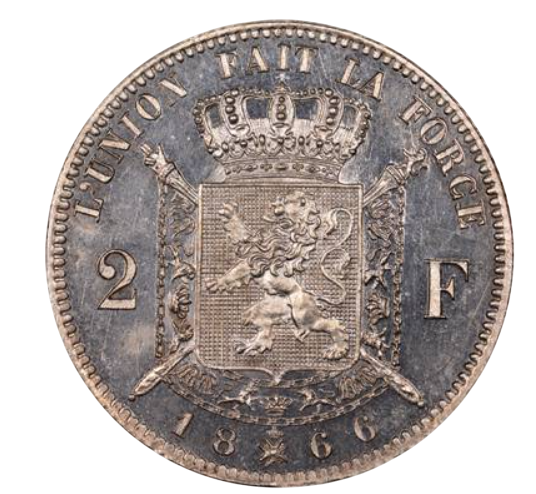
Lesser coat of arms of Belgium on a coin.

=== Shield version ===
The shield version is now rarely used, it used to be mainly on coins and military badges.

Coat of arms Belgium (shield, with crown)

Coat of arms Belgium (shield)

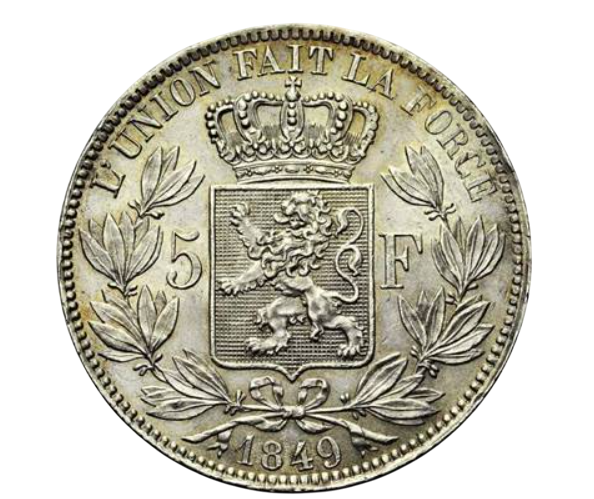
Belgian shield (with crown) on a coin

Coat of arms of the Belgian Royal Military Academy (shield seen in the middle of the red field with a crown and a sword right thru the middle)

=== Royal versions ===
A Royal Decree published on 19 July 2019 and signed on the same day, by King Philippe, reinstated the Saxonian escutcheon in all the royal versions of the family's coat of arms. The reinstatement of the shield of Saxe-Coburg-Gotha into the royal arms occurred shortly after the visit of King Philippe and Queen Mathilde to the ancestral Friedenstein Castle. The king also added translations of the motto into the three official languages of Belgium, to reflect his wish "to be the King of the whole Kingdom and of all Belgians". The latest royal decree therefore reverses previous changes made to the Royal versions of the coat arms which removed the armorial bearings of Saxony during the First World War.

Reigning King's or Queen's (Royal Arms) version

Sable, a lion rampant or, armed and langued Gules charged on the shoulder with an escutcheon of the House of Wettin. The shield is surmounted by a golden helm with the Royal Crown of Belgium and lambrequin Or and Sable. The shield surrounded by the necklace of the Order of Leopold. The supporter are two lions guardant proper each supporting a lance Or with two National Flags of Belgium. Motto: Eendracht maakt macht - L'union fait la force - Einigkeit macht stark, in gold letters, on a ribbon Gules, edged Sable. The whole is placed on a mantle Purpure with ermine lining, fringes and tassels Or and ensigned with the Royal Crown of Belgium.

Former King or Queen's version

The Royal Arms difference with a label of three points Gules, the centre point bearing the royal crown Or. The shield is surmounted by the Royal Crown of Belgium.

Duke or Duchess of Brabant version

The Royal Arms difference with a label of three points Or. The shield is surmounted by the Princely Crown of Belgium. The supporters each accompanied by a banner of gold, fringed likewise, bearing Sable, a golden lion, armed and langued Gules (Brabant).

Other Princes or Princesses of Belgium of the male and female descent in direct line of King Leopold I

The Royal Arms difference with a narrow bordure Or. The shield is surmounted by the Princely Crown of Belgium.

Other Princes or Princesses of Our Royal House

The Royal Arms difference with a narrow bordure Purpure. The shield is surmounted by the Princely Crown of Belgium.

==== Coat of arms of the (former) King of Belgium ====
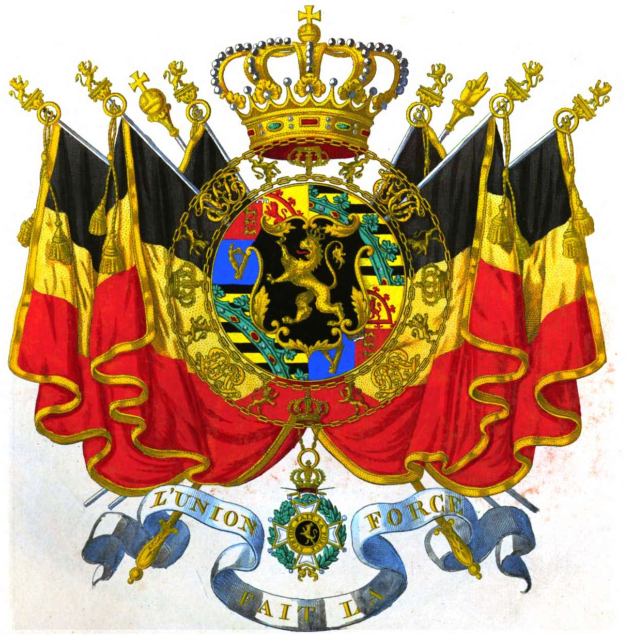
Coat of Arms of King Leopold I of Belgium (1831-1846)

Coat of Arms of King Leopold I of Belgium (1846-1865)

Coat of Arms of King Leopold II of Belgium (1865-1902)

Coat of arms of King Albert I, Leopold III, Baudouin and Albert II of Belgium (1902-2019)

Coat of arms of King Philippe of Belgium (2019-now)
Coat of arms of the Belgian royal family

Coat of arms of the King of Belgians, King Philippe

Coat of arms of the Belgian royal house (greater)

Coat of arms of the Belgian royal house (middle)

Coat of arms of the Belgian royal house (small)

Coat of arms of the Prince of Belgium

Coat of arms of the Princess of Belgium

Coat of arms of a prince of the Royal house

Coat of arms of a princess of the Royal house

Coat of arms of the prince and Duke of Brabant

Coat of arms of the princess and Duchess of Brabant (Princes Elisabeth)

==== Coat of arms of the Royal couple ====
Coat of arms of the Current King Philippe and Queen Mathilde

Coat of arms of the former King Albert II and Queen Paola

Coat of arms of the former King Baudouin and Queen Fabiola

Coat of arms of the former King Leopold III and Queen Astrid

Coat of arms of the former King Albert I and Queen Elisabeth

Coat of arms of the former king Leopold II and Queen Marie

Coat of arms of the first king of the Belgians Leopold I and Queen Louise

== See also ==
- Belgian heraldry
- Leo Belgicus
