= Belgian lion =

Heraldic symbol

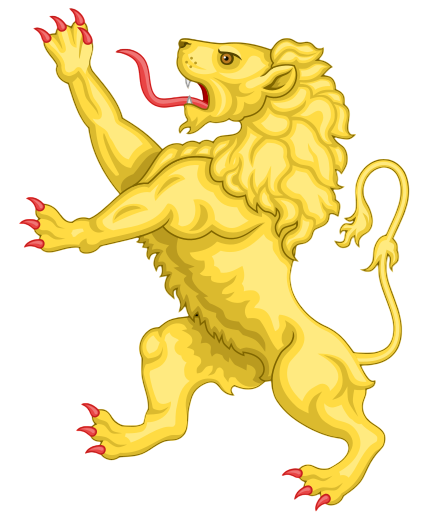
- Leo Belgicus (Belgische leeuw)

Versions
- Coat of Arms Belgium

- Coat of arms of Brabant
- Alternative name: Leo Belgicus
- Other elements: Black; Yellow; Red

The Leo Belgicus (Latin for "Belgian lion") is a heraldic lion with an origin dating back to the Middle Ages of the Southern Netherlands. This symbol was adopted by the Duchy of Brabant and is now the symbol and national animal of Belgium.

== Origin ==
The heraldic lion became a widely used symbol in the Low Countries in the 12th and 13th centuries. The lion on the Belgian coat of arms is primarily based on the Brabant Lion, the emblem of the Duchy of Brabant. This coat of arms consisted of a golden lion with red claws and tongue on a black shield and was first used by Henry I of Brabant (1165-1235).

The Kingdom of Belgium decided to base its coat of arms and flag on the symbols used by the short-lived United Belgian States. These emerged after the Belgians fought off Austrian rule over the southern Netherlands. The Duchy of Brabant had taken the lead in this (Brabant) Revolution, the uprising against Emperor Joseph II, and subsequently dominated the United Belgian States. Therefore, the Brabant Lion (Leo Belgicus) came to symbolize the entire federation, and eventually Belgium as well.

== History ==
The choice of the lion as a heraldic symbol in the Duchy of Brabant (1183-1795) and the Low Countries has deep historical and symbolic roots. The lion became one of the most popular heraldic animals in heraldry during the Middle Ages, primarily because it represented strength, courage, and royal dignity. As the "king of beasts" the lion was the ideal symbol for princes and knights who wanted to display their power and bravery.

In the Low Countries, the lion became an important heraldic emblem for several principalities. For the County of Flanders (862-1795), a black lion on a yellow shield was introduced by Philip of Alsace (1168-1191), Count of Flanders. Other principalities, such as Hainaut, Namur, Limburg, and Luxembourg, also incorporated a lion into their coats of arms.

The Brabant Lion, a golden lion on a black shield, was adopted around 1190 by the Dukes of Brabant and would later form the basis for the Belgian coat of arms.

=== Duchy of Brabant ===
The Brabantian lion is the heraldic symbol of the Duchy of Brabant, the lion depicten as "a gold lion on a black shield with red gules and tongue" It was first used by Henry I of Brabant (1165-1235). The origin of the lion is probably the older Limburgish lion, which was used by the Duchy of Limburg (1065–1797). Through the ages the lion was not only the symbol of Brabant but many kingdoms, counties and duchies in the Southern Netherlands. The symbolc meaning behind the lion in heraldry is strength, courage and royalty. There were ment to represent the kingdom, duchy of county and their king, duke or count. As they wanted to appear strong, courageous and a good king.

=== Eighty Years' War ===
During the Dutch Revolt in 1578, the provinces that rebelled against the rule of King Philip II adopted a common seal featuring Leo Belgicus, wearing a crown and holding a sword and a bundle of arrows. The crown represented sovereignty, the sword the war against Spain, and the arrows the unity and concord of the rebellious provinces. Initially, the lion of the (Dutch) Republic of the Seven United Provinces had the Brabant colors (gold, black, and red). Only when most of Brabant was recaptured by Spain in the 1580s and Holland came to dominate the Republic did the colors of the Brabant lion (black, gold, and red) become the definitive shades of the coat of arms of the United Provinces.

=== United Belgian States ===
The Brabant Lion not only has an important place in the history of the Duchy of Brabant, but also in the United Belgian States. During the Brabant Revolution (1790), which was the height of the resistance against Habsburg rule over the Southern Netherlands. The revolution led to the temporary establishment of the Brabant Republic. During this short period, the Brabant Lion was used to symbolize the renewed national identity and was incorporated into the flag and coats of arms of the United Belgian States. Although the Habsburgs eventually regained control of the region and the Brabant Lion remained a powerful symbol of regional pride and the struggle for autonomy of the Belgian people.

=== United Kingdom of the Netherlands ===
The Brabant lion has also played an important role in the history of the Kingdom of the Netherlands, both in the early days of the kingdom and in the symbolism of the various provinces that emerged from the historic Duchy of Brabant The Brabant lion remained an important element in the heraldic tradition of the region, especially in the coats of arms of the provinces of North Brabant and South Brabant, which emerged from the old Duchy of Brabant.

=== Kingdom of Belgium ===
Because Brabant had been the most important duchy in the Southern Netherlands during the late Middle Ages, the Brabant lion was elevated to the coat of arms of Belgium. The ducal crown was naturally replaced by a royal crown. Two lions were also added as shield holders and the motto "L'union Fait la Force" (Union is strength) was added. The Belgian flag is based on the Brabant coat of arms, using the colors found in the coat of arms.

The Belgian coat of arms features the Leo Belgicus, or Brabant lion, at its center. Both the coat of arms and the flag of Belgium were inspired by those of the United Belgian States, which symbolized the first struggle for Belgian independence. The lion was taken from the Duchy of Brabant (Leo Belgicus), and the black-yellow-red colors are derived from this lion, just as they are in the United Belgian States.

After Belgium took over the Brabantian lion as their national symbol during the Belgian revolution (1830-1831), the lion became the Belgian lion.

After the Belgian Revolution, on January 23, 1831, the National Congress incorporated the coat of arms and the flag into the Constitution. Article 193 of the Constitution states: "The Belgian Nation chooses red, yellow, and black as its colors, and the Belgian Lion with the motto "Unity Makes Strength" as its national coat of arms".

== Heraldry ==
=== Kingdom of Belgium ===

The coat of arms of the Kingdom of Belgium features in the centre a Belgian Lion (Leo Belgicus)

Description: "At the center is a gold lion, nailed and tongued gules, on a sable field. The shield holders consist of two facing lions, each holding a shield and a spear bearing the Belgian flag. At the bottom of the shield hang the Order of Leopold and the national motto: "L'union fait la Force - Eendracht maakt macht - Einigkeit magt Stark" (Union makes strength - Unity makes strength). The coat of arms is covered by a red ermine mantle tied with yellow cords; this represents the monarchy. The coat of arms is crowned with the royal crown of Belgium."

The Belgian coats of arms features the Leo Belgicus, or the Belgian lion, at its center. Both the coat of arms and the flag of Belgium were inspired by those of the United Belgian States, which symbolized the first struggle for Belgian independence. The lion was taken from the Duchy of Brabant, the Leo Belgicus. The black-yellow-red colors are derived from this lion, just as they are with the United Belgian States. A lion with the motto "Unity Makes Strength."

=== Duchy of Brabant ===
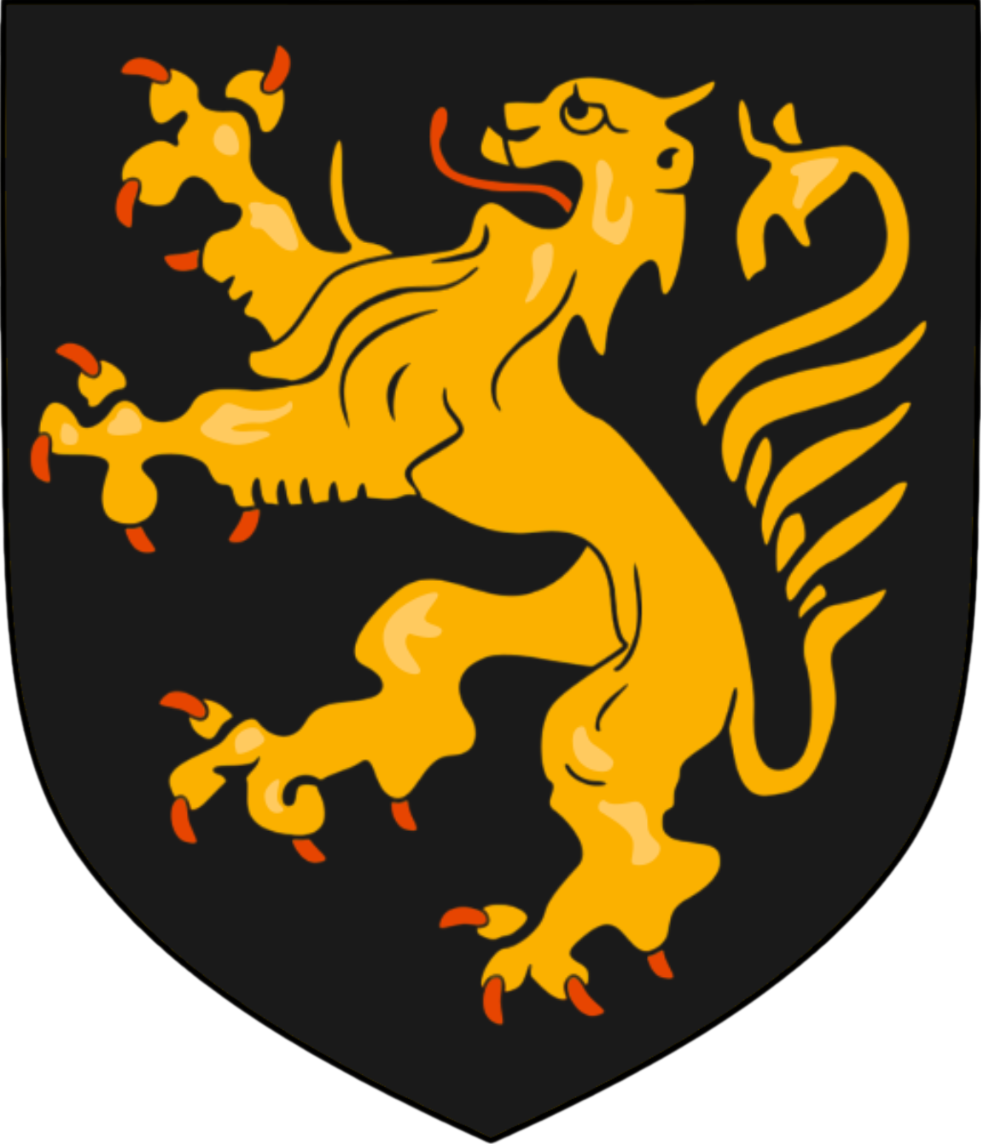

The coat of arms of the Duchy of Brabant features in black, a yellow with red claws and tongue (Leo Belgicus).

Description: "In black a lion of gold, nailed and tongued at the throat"

This is the first version and the first time the Leo Belgicus (Belgian lion) or then still the Brabant lion appears, which was also a golden lion with red claws and tongue on a black background. This coat of arms would later serve as inspiration for the coats of arms of Belgium, the short-lived United Belgian States, and the provinces of Brabant in Belgium and the Netherlands. The first Duke of Brabant to use a lion as a heraldic symbol was Godfrey the Bearded. Godfrey, already Count of Leuven, received the area as a fief in 1106 and incorporated the lion into his banner. Henry I later adopted this lion in his coat of arms in the twelfth century. Whether the lion and the shield already had the same colors at that time is unknown.

== See also ==
- Kingdom of Belgium
- Coat of arms of Belgium
- Duchy of Brabant
- United Belgian States
- Lion (heraldry)
- Dutch Republic lion
