= Dutch Republic Lion =

Symbol of the Dutch Republic

Dutch Republic lion
- Armiger: Dutch Republic
- Alternative name: Lion of the Generality
- Adopted: 1579
- Shield: Gules, a lion of gold, nailed and tongued azure, holding in the dexter claw raised in an oblique left position a sword of silver with a gold hilt and in the left dexter claw a bundle of seven arrows of silver with gold points, the arrows tied together with a ribbon also of gold
- Motto: concordia res parvae crescunt (Harmony makes small things grow)

The Dutch Republic Lion (also known as States Lion) was the badge of the Union of Utrecht, the Republic of the Seven United Netherlands, and a precursor of the current coat of arms of the Kingdom the Netherlands.

== Origin ==
The Dutch Republic Lion was subsequently adopted in 1584, in gold on a red shield, as the coat of arms of the Republic of the Seven United Netherlands (Dutch Republic). The gold on red colors are a reversal of the then established and recognizable coat of arms of Holland, the most influential and rebellious province of the Eighty Years' War. In 1609, the lion was augmented by a crown. It remained in use as the coat of arms of the Netherlands for over 200 years, until 1795. Because of this, the name "Lion of the Generality" is often seen as a synonym for this coat of arms, rather than as the name for the lion itself.

== History ==
=== Dutch republic ===
The Republic of the Seven United Netherlands, often referred to in literature as the Dutch Republic, was a confederation with features of a defensive alliance and a customs union. It largely covered the territory of present-day Netherlands.

The Republic came into being after a number of duchies, lordships, and cities formed the Union of Utrecht in 1579, an alliance to jointly oppose the harsh administrative measures of the Habsburg ruler of the Netherlands, Philip II, who ruled the territories in the first instance and was also King of Spain. With the Act of Abjuration, they renounced him in 1581. In 1588, a number of provinces, each with its own autonomous government, continued independently as a confederal republic without Philip II's permission.

Initially, the Republic did not have its own coat of arms. For the first few months, the States General used the arms of Brabant, because Brabant was then the leading province in the Habsburg Netherlands; it was centrally located, the seat of government was in Brussels, and it was economically very prosperous. But in 1579, the Duke of Parma, the Spanish general Alexander Farnese, launched a campaign against the rebellious Dutch provinces (Parma's Nine Years) and quickly conquered several Brabant cities ('s-Hertogenbosch on July 1, 1579, see Schermersoproer), while Leuven and Diest were already in Spanish hands. As a result, Brabant was no longer a suitable symbol for the Dutch Revolt, and a different coat of arms "the Lion of the Generality", was adopted.

Arms of the Duke of Anjou and alençon

=== New States Lion ===
After the completion of its forming in 1584 the Republic of the Seven United Provinces used as its arms: Or a crowned lion Gules armed and langued Azure, holding in his dexter paw a sword and in the sinister paw seven arrows tight together Azure. The colours of this version where derived from the most important of the seven provinces, the county of Holland (its arms are still in use since being adopted by the counts of Holland c. 1198).

The sovereignty of the federal union was emphasized by the title of the States General "their Noble Mightinesses, the Lords States-General of the United Provinces of the Netherlands" or, in Dutch, "Den Heeren Hoog-Mogenden, Den Heeren Staten-Generaal der Verenigde Provinciën der Nederlanden"). and by a crown on the lion in their arms.

Seal of Batavia (1802–1806)

=== Batavian Republic ===
The Batavian Republic founded in 1795 used in its first year the arms of the Dutch Republic, i.e. the Dutch lion or lion with crown, sheaf of arrows and swords. But on May 4, 1796, the Dutch Lion badge was replaced by a free drawing of the Netherlands Maiden around an altar with an anchor, and the States Lion with her.

The substitution in 1801 of the Batavian Republic by the Batavian Commonwealth, whose main feature was a stronger Grand Pensionary acting the part locally of the First Counsul Bonaparte also had its impact on heraldry. On April 12, 1802, it was decided that the new badge of the Commonwealth would be a golden lion on a red field again. The number of arrows that bears the lion in the leg was not established. This remained in use until the Kingdom of Holland was formed in 1806 for Napoleon's brother, installed as King Louis I of Holland.

Coat of Arms William I

=== Sovereign Prince Willem Frederik ===
The Lion of Generality made a brief reintroductionupon the return of Willem Frederik, son of the last stadtholder. He was appointed sovereign prince of the United Netherlands at the end of 1813. To reflect this new situation in his coat of arms, he abandoned the old Orange-Nassau coat of arms (see above) and opted for a new design.

In this new coat of arms from 1814, he combined the lion of the Republic with the most important elements of his family coat of arms. The coat of arms thus consists of: the former coat of arms of the Republic, the former family heart shield with the coat of arms of Chalon-Orange-Geneva, and (with the heart shield superimposed on it) the Nassau family coat of arms (Otto).

=== Kingdom of the Netherlands ===
When William VI of Orange returned to the Netherlands in 1813 and was proclaimed Sovereign Prince of the Netherlands, he quartered the former Arms of the Dutch Republic (1st and 4th quarter) with the "Châlon-Orange" arms (2nd and 3rd quarter), which had come to symbolize Orange. As an in escutcheon he placed his ancestral arms of Nassau. (See House of Orange-Nassau) When he became King in 1815, he combined the Dutch Republic Lion with the billets of the Nassau arms and added a royal crown to form the Coat of arms of the Netherlands. In 1907, Queen Wilhelmina replaced the royal crown on the lion and the shield bearers of the arms with a coronet and had the phallus of the lion removed.

== Heraldry ==
=== New States Lion ===
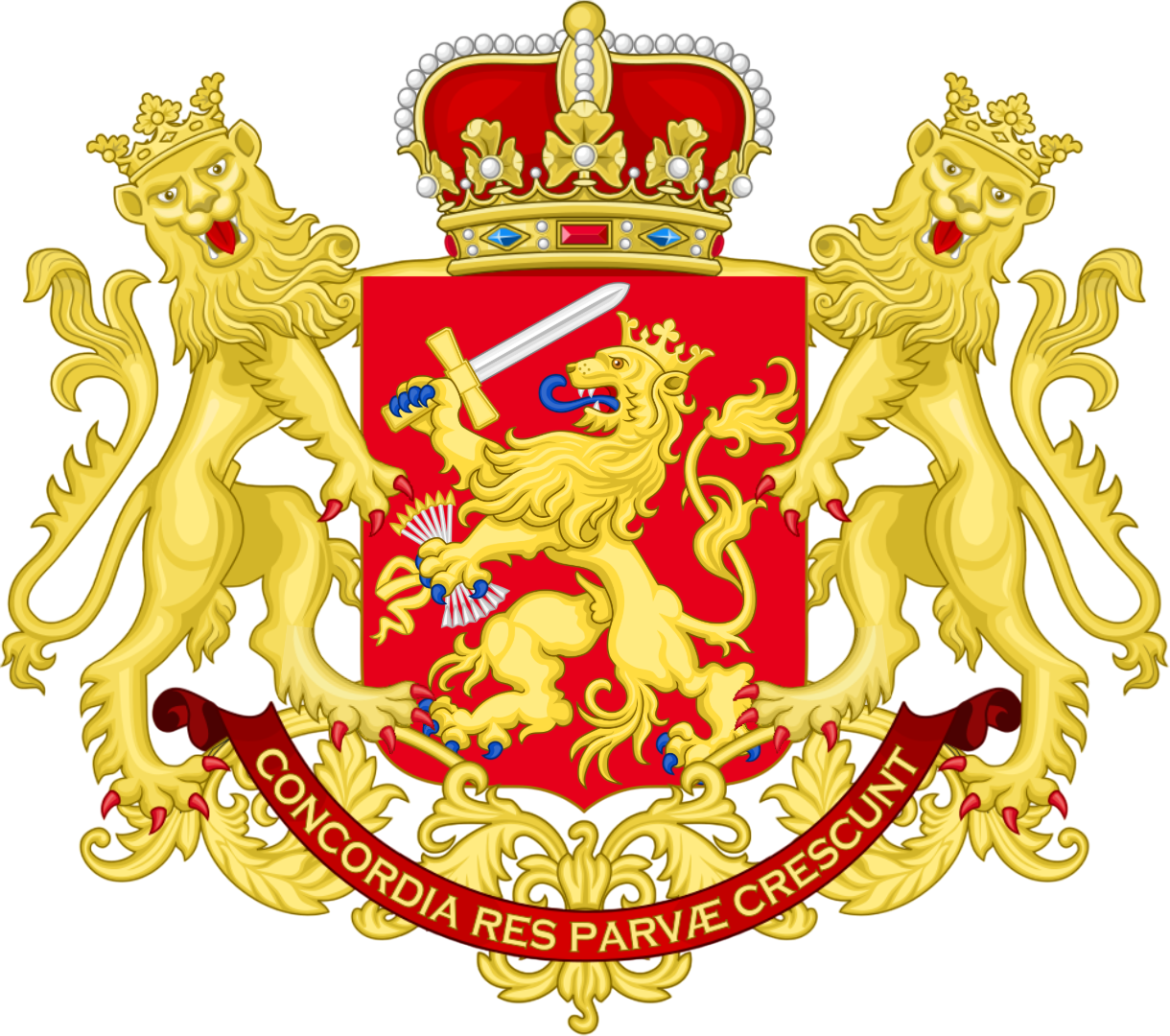

The coat of arms of the Republic of the Seven United Netherlands is the coat of arms that inspired the coat of arms of the Netherlands.

Description: "In azure, studded with blocks of gold, a lion of gold, tongued and nailed gules"

The new royal coat of arms of the Netherlands is based on the coat of arms of the Republic of the Seven United Netherlands. This coat of arms is based on the coat of arms of Holland, a golden lion on a red background. A sword, arrows, and crown were added to the lion in the Republic's coat of arms, which were later also added to the coat of arms of the Netherlands. At that time, the lion was still called the Generality Lion.

=== Coat of Arms of the Kingdom of the Netherlands ===
The Coat of Arms of the Kingdom of the Netherlands is the coat of arms of the Netherlands.

Description: "Shield: Azure, studded with blocks of gold, a gold lion, crowned with a coronet of three leaves and two pearl points of the same, tongued and nailed gules, holding in the right fore claw, in an oblique position to the left, a silver sword with a gold hilt, and in the left fore claw a bundle of seven silver arrows with gold points, the arrows tied together with a ribbon also of gold. As shield-holders are two gold lions, tongued and nailed gules; the motto (heraldic device) 'Je Maintiendrai' in Latin letters of gold on a ribbon of azure"

The new royal coat of arms of the Netherlands is based on the coat of arms of Nassau, with the lion replaced by the Lion of Generality, complete with sword, arrows, and crown. In other words, the coat of arms of Nassau is equipped with the crown, sheaf of arrows, and sword of the Lion of Generality. From that moment on, the lion is referred to as the Dutch Lion rather than the Generality Lion, and it therefore appears on a blue and gold checkered shield.

== See also ==
- Coat of arms of the Kingdom of the Netherlands
- Dutch lion
- Lion (heraldry)
- Belgian Lion (Leo Belgicus)
