= Staden =

- Municipality
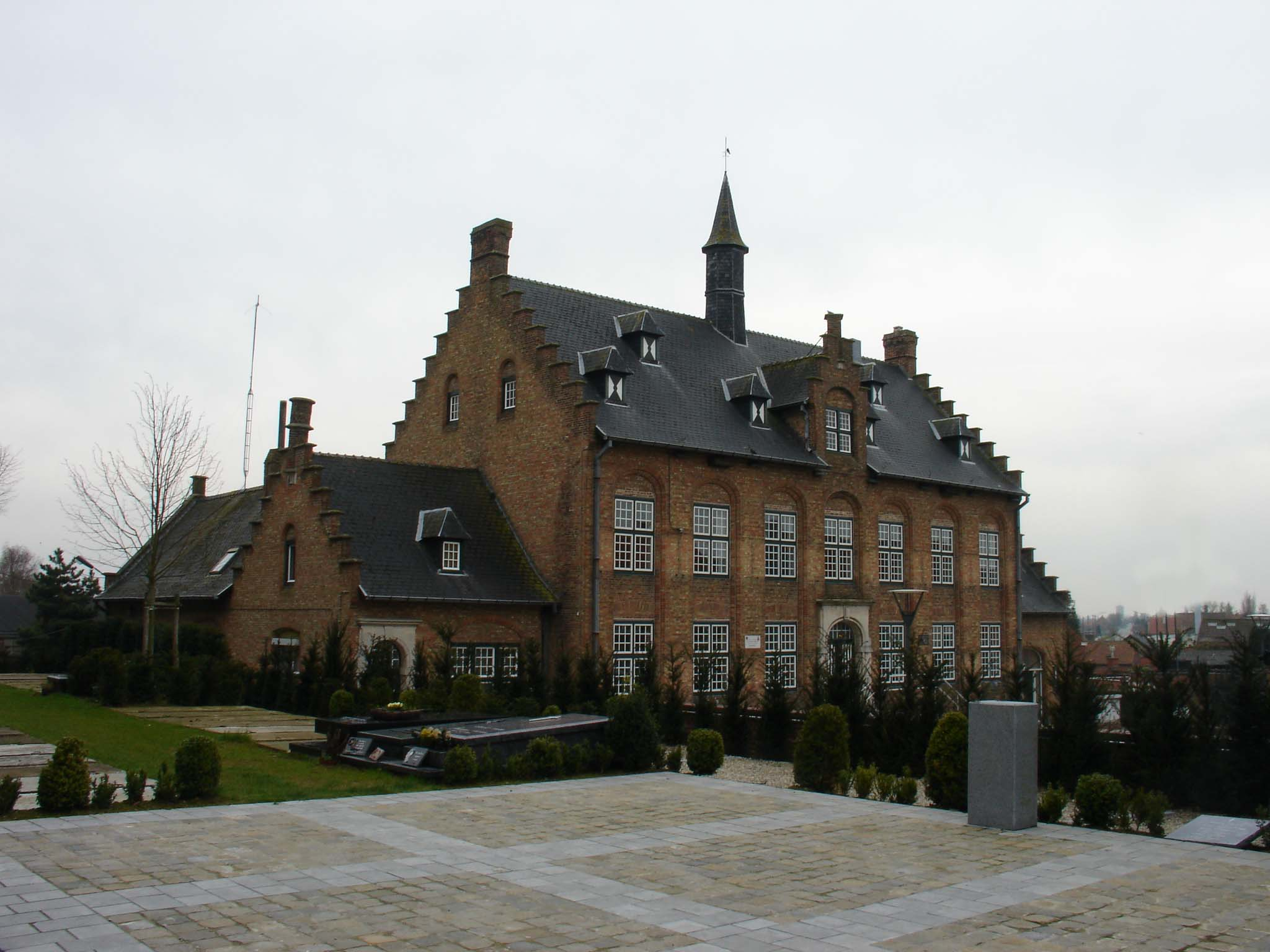

- Flag Coat of arms

- Location of Staden in West Flanders
- Interactive map of Staden
- Location in Belgium
- Coordinates: 50°59′N 03°01′E
- Country: Belgium
- Community: Flemish Community
- Region: Flemish Region
- Province: West Flanders
- Arrondissement: Roeselare

Government
  - Mayor: Francesco Vanderjeugd
  - Governing party: Open Vld

Area
  - Total: 46.82 km^{2} (18.08 sq mi)

Population (2018-01-01)
  - Total: 11,376
  - Density: 243.0/km^{2} (629.3/sq mi)
- Postal codes: 8840
- NIS code: 36019
- Area codes: 051
- Website: www.staden.be

Staden (Dutch pronunciation: [ˈstaːdə(n)]; West Flemish: Stoan [stɒːn]) is a village and rural municipality in the Belgian province of West Flanders. The municipality has around 11 000 inhabitants.

In the local West-Flemish dialect, the d is not pronounced, which results in Stoan as pronunciation.

== Geography ==
In 1976, Staden fused with the smaller villages of Oostnieuwkerke and Westrozebeke into a single municipality. As Staden was the bigger village, its name was used for the resulting municipality. Next to those three village centres, there are also a number of smaller hamlets. At the boundary between Staden, Westrozebeke and Poelkapelle, you can find the hamlet Vijfwegen. And on the boundary between Oostnieuwkerke and Hooglede, you can find the hamlet Sleihage. Both these hamlets had their own church and parish. The remaining population is spread over even smaller hamlets.

#	Name	Area (km²)	Population (31/12/2009)
I	Staden	25,43	5.424
II	Oostnieuwkerke	10,80	3.447
III (IV)	Westrozebeke: Vijfwegen	10,00	2.181

Source: Website gemeente Staden

The municipality of Staden borders the following villages and municipalities:

- a. Roeselare (town of Roeselare)
- b. Passendale (municipality of Zonnebeke)
- c. Poelkapelle (municipality of Langemark-Poelkapelle)
- d. Houthulst (municipality of Houthulst)
- e. Zarren (municipality of Kortemark)
- f. Handzame (municipality of Kortemark)
- g. Hooglede, (municipality of Hooglede)

Staden with its part-municipalities and neighbours.

== History ==
The village of Staden was founded nearby the castle of Staden, around 1100. That castle was built in the forests, near the road between Ypres and Bruges. The castle of Staden fell mostly under the control of Ypres, but also partially under the control of Bruges. The castle itself was completely destroyed in 1917, during the First World War. Only a part of the moat remains, and a bench built from the stones of the old castle.

== Politics ==
Staden has always been known as a Christian-democrat municipality, like so many other rural municipalities in West Flanders, where the CVP and later CD&V always held the majority or even absolute majority of the seats, and thus was always able to deliver the mayor.

However, after the election of 2012, it appeared that the Christian-democrats only got 10 of the 21 seats. On the evening of the counting, the three opposition parties: Open Vld, N-VA and sp.a got to an agreement and formed the majority with 11 of 21 seats. After the inauguration in 2013, Francesco Vanderjeugd from the Open Vld was the mayor of Staden. But the tight majority where all seats are needed caused some troubles. Near the end of 2014, Koen Demonie threatened to leave the N-VA, which would cost the majority one seat, and would make the municipality ungovernable.

=== Mayors of Staden since the fusion ===
- 1976-1982: Eugene Dermaut, CVP
- 1983-1992: Godfried De Tavernier, CVP
- 1992-2012: Josiane Lowie, CD&V
- 2013–present: Francesco Vanderjeugd, Open Vld

=== Resultaten gemeenteraadsverkiezingen sinds 1976 ===
Party	10-10-1976		10-10-1982		9-10-1988		9-10-1994		8-10-2000		8-10-2006		14-10-2012	
Votes / Seats	%	21	%	21	%	21	%	21	%	21	%	21	%	21
CVP^{1}/CD&V^{2}	50,29^{1}	11	42,78^{1}	10	48,21^{1}	12	57,21^{1}	12	57,88^{1}	12	60,12^{2}	14	41,9^{2}	10
N-VA	-		-		-		-		-		-		26,89	6
SP^{1}/sp.a^{2}	-		13,98^{1}	2	8,63^{1}	1	-		-		-		8,44^{2}	1
AKTIE	36,77	8	-		21,47	4	-		-		-		-	
NIEUW	12,95	2	-		-		-		-		-		-	
PVV/Open Vld	-		8,56	1	21,68	4	-		-		-		22,77	4
AKTIE-N	-		34,68	8	-		-		-		-		-	
SAMEN	-		-		-		42,79	9	42,12	9	32,46	7	-	
V.V.D.S.	-		-		-		-		-		7,42	0	-	
Total number of votes	7744		7915		7993		8063		8063		8219		8155	
Attendance %					96,51		96,21		95,17		95,96		94,31	
Blank and invalid %	3,06		3,49		4,5		5,53		6,23		5,84		5,42	
