= Andreas Vanpoucke =

Belgian painter and etcher (born 1959)

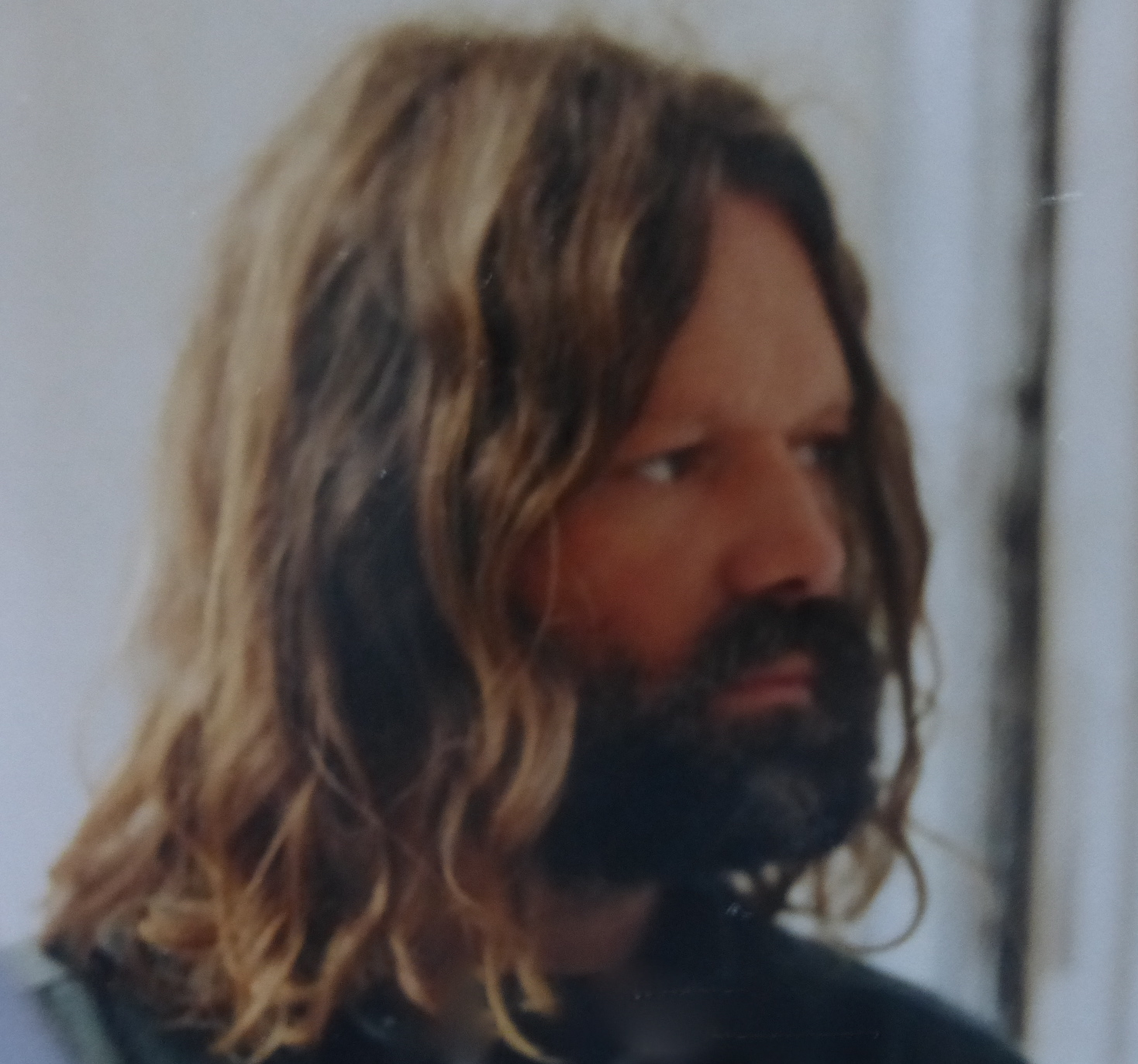

Andreas Vanpoucke (born 5 August 1959 in Diksmuide) is a Belgian painter and etcher.

Born in Diksmuide, Belgium, he was educated from 1975 to 1982 at the fine art school in Ghent, Belgium. During his studies, his personal research on engravings, drawings and oil paintings were on Rembrandt, Degas and Ensor as well as figurative painting of the nineteenth and twentieth centuries.

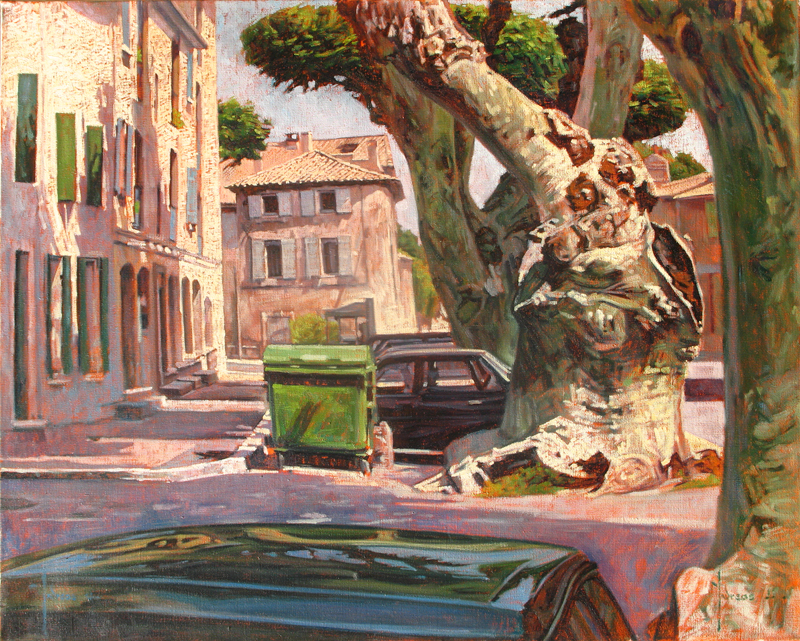
Square in Saint-Rémy-de-Provence, oilpainting, 80x100 cm

He was offered a professorship at the Graduate School St. Lucas, Karel de Grote Hogeschool in Antwerp, Belgium, where he entered in 1983. He is Professor of Fine Arts in drawing and painting. Between 1975 and 1999, he produced numerous art calendars at the request of the cultural organizations in cities such as Blankenberge, Koksijde, Handzame, Bruges, Saint Remy de Provence, etc. He has been painting since his childhood, mainly oil, but he also produced numerous drawings, watercolors and etchings. Back from his travels in Portugal, he discovered France and Provence and decided to settle in 1997 in Saint Rémy de Provence. His first solo exhibition there, entitled "Saint Rémy daily", held in 1999 at the Zero Hang'Art gallery of the Surreal painter François Otte. Since then, the mayor of Saint Remy de Provence continually exposes the main triptych and mainly private collectors own his oeuvres. He created a series of large oil paintings around " Les Calanques " and "Les Baux de Provence"

From 2006 he focused his work on the city of Antwerp and its inhabitants. In 2007 he exhibited "The Mosaic of Antwerp", with over two hundred 30×40 cm acrylics and has a multi-faceted face of metropolis. In May 2010 he was invited by the village of Barbizon to participate at the international exposition " l'Angelus de Millet 150 years " In 2010 and 2011 he showed his "wall of tenderness" on Leila Voight's first and second international festival of contemporary art APart in Saint-Rémy de Provence.

During the winter of 2012 he started his etching cyclus ' Le Midi en Noir et Blanc ' In April 2013 he showed his Antwerpmosaïc in the ancient 'De Beuckelaer' atelier in Antwerp -Kievit In 2014 he was invited as guest in the Jacques Gorus atelier with the exhibition ' Une poignée de pointes sèches' with the catalogue designed by Dooreman nl:Gert Dooreman In 2015 he showed his 'wall of tenderness' at the request of the Cultural circle of Kortemark in the exhibition ' Van Handzame tot de Provence '

== Paintings ==
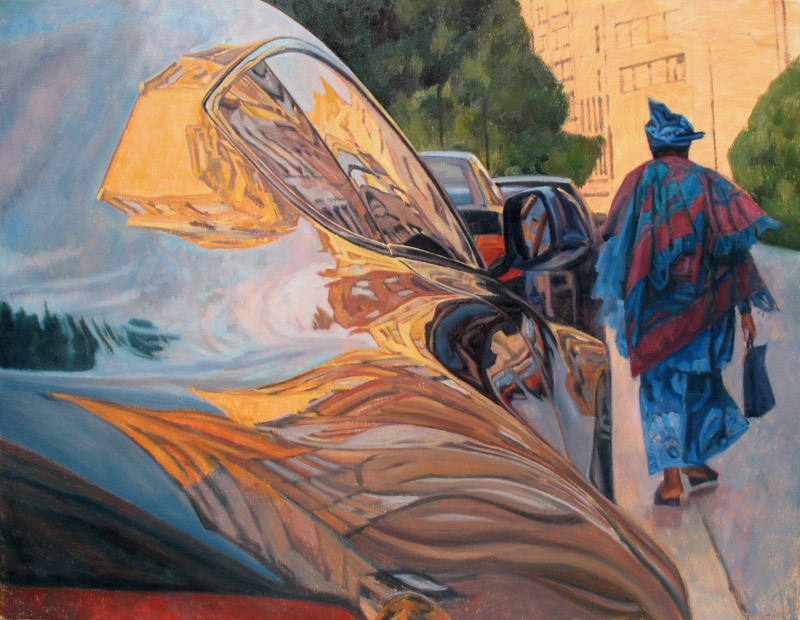

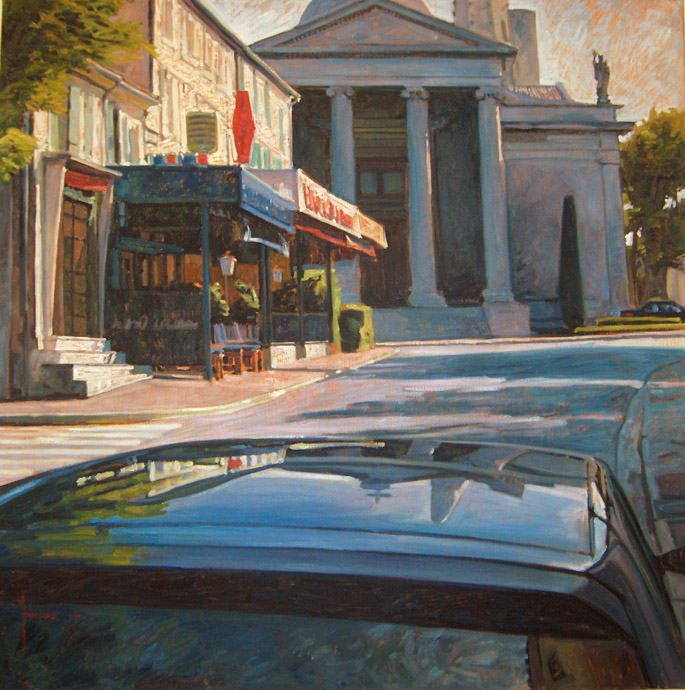

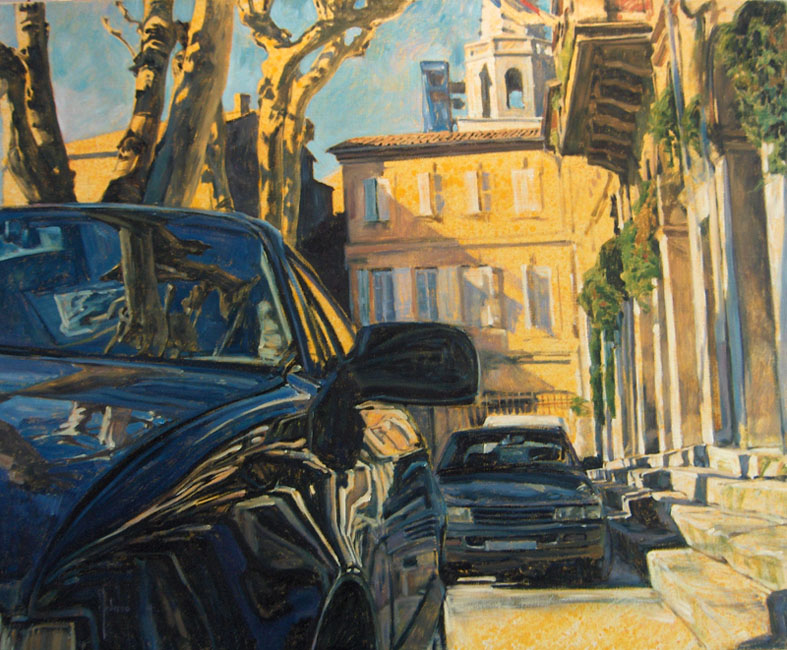

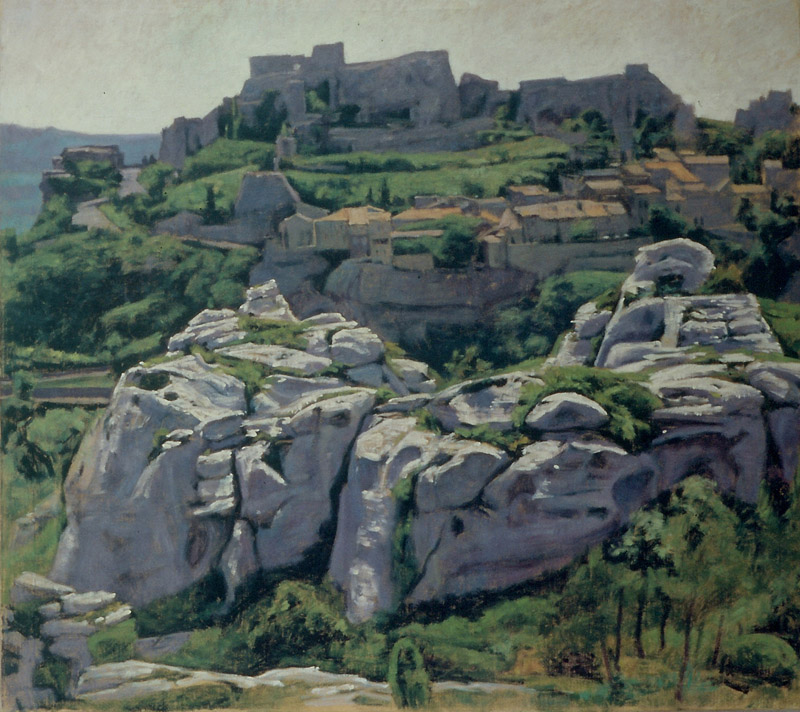

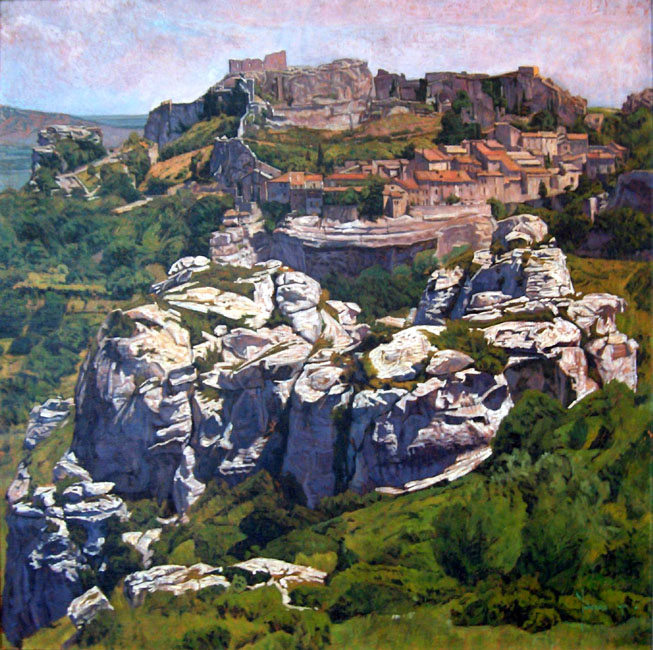

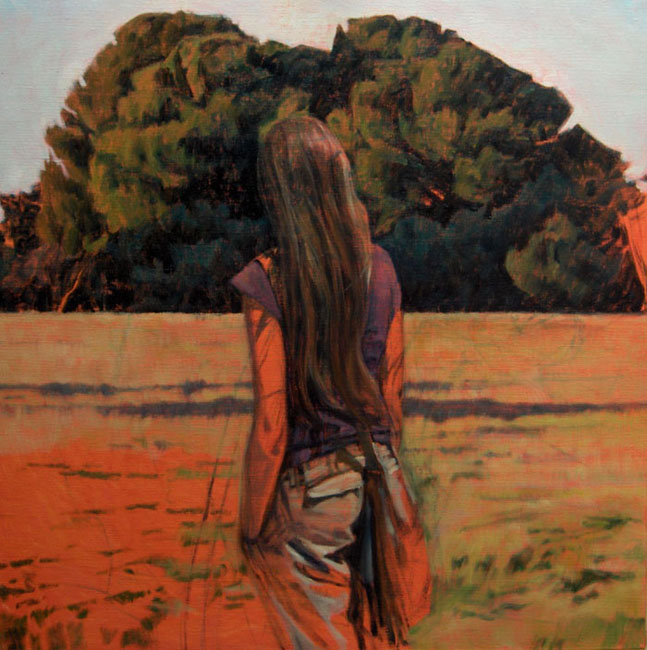

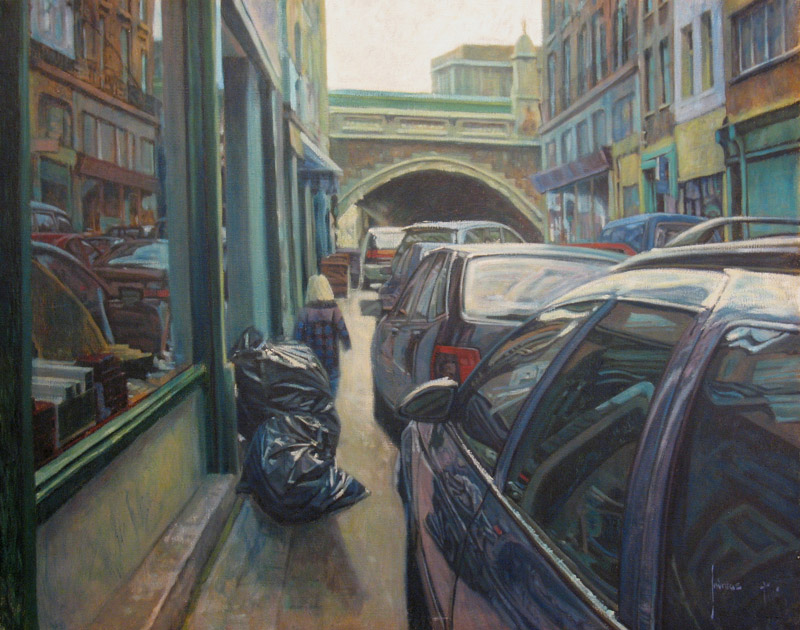

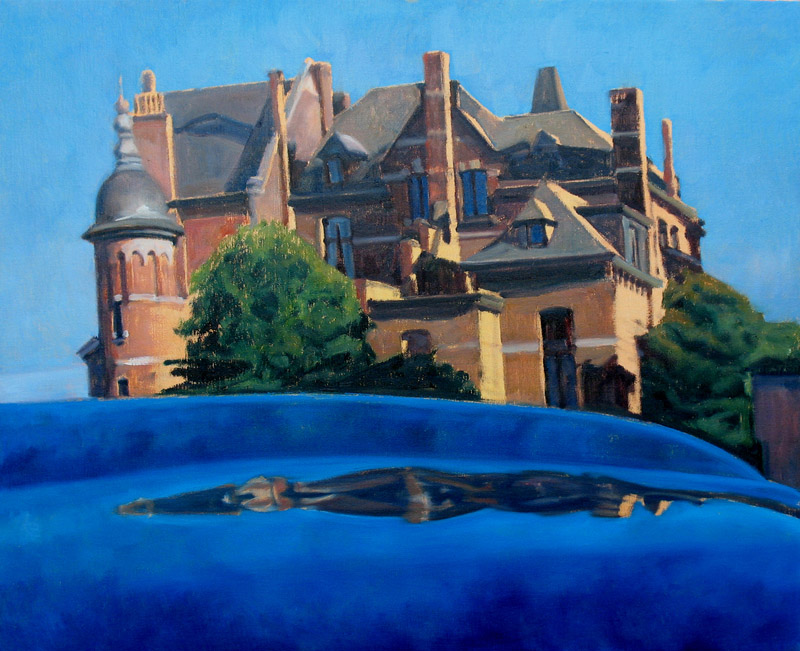

== Prints ==
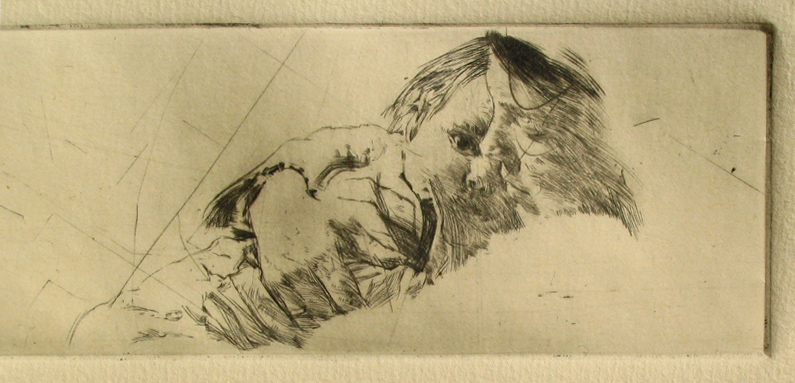

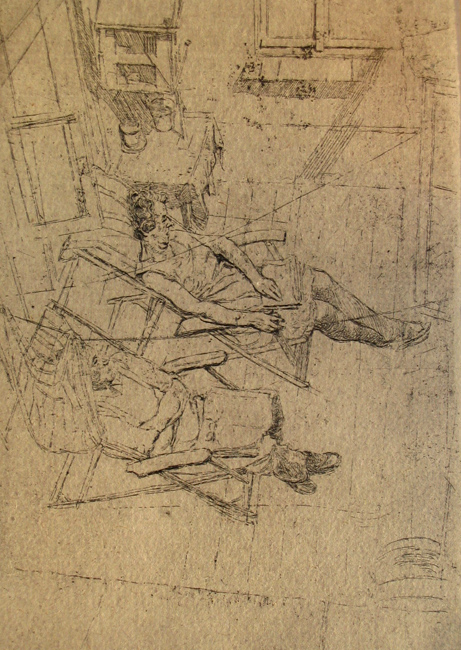
