= Handzame =

Village in West Flanders, Belgium

Coordinates: 51°02′N 3°00′E

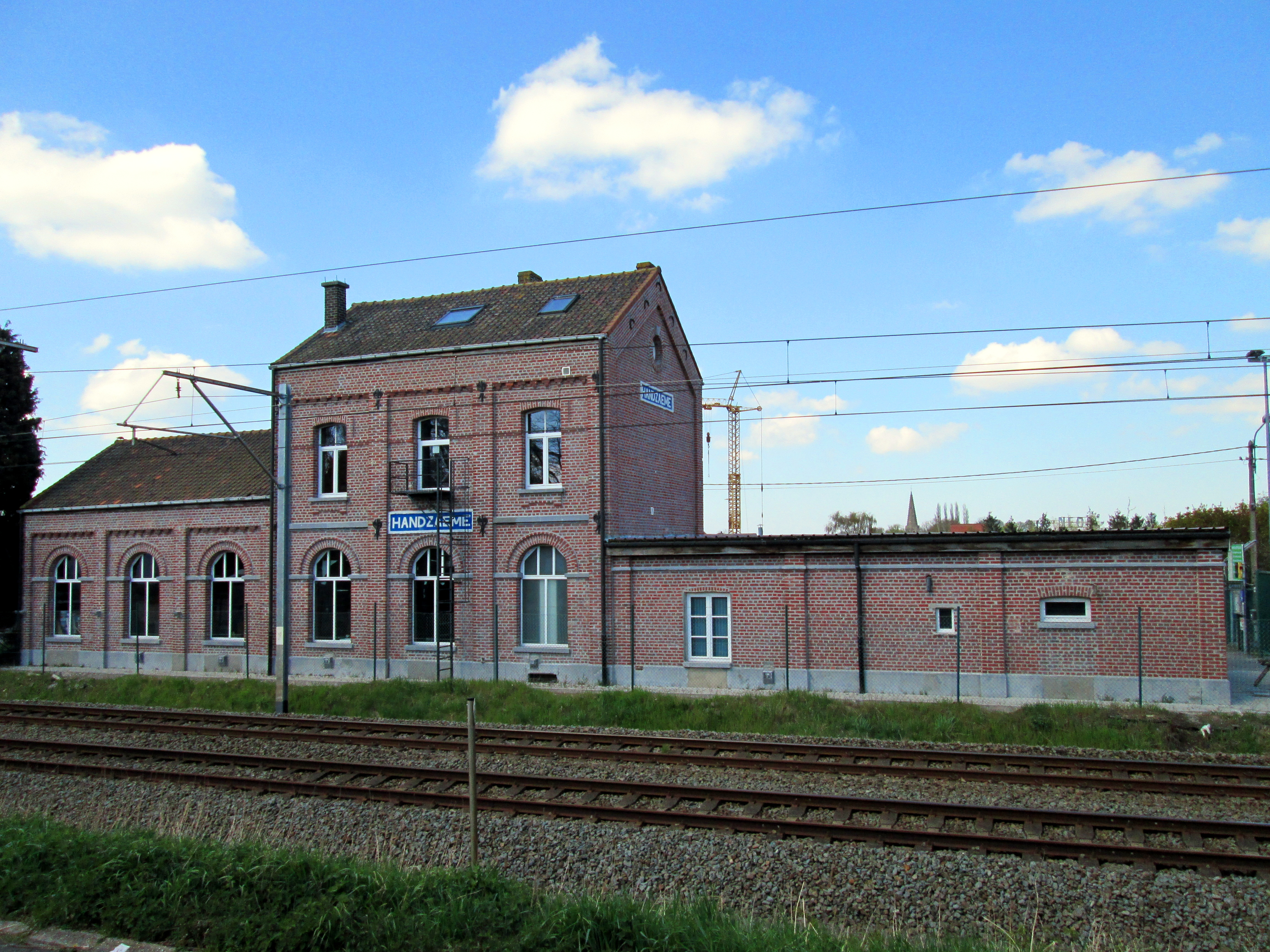

Handzame is a village in the Belgian province West Flanders. It is part of the Kortemark municipality, which also comprises the villages Werken, Zarren and Kortemark itself.
