= Ysco =

Belgian ice cream producer

Ysco NV
- Company type: Subsidiary
- Industry: Ice cream
- Founded: 1949; 77 years ago
- Headquarters: Langemark, Langemark-Poelkapelle, West Flanders, Belgium
- Area served: Europe
- Key people: Bert Van Nieuwenborgh (CEO)
- Products: ice cream
- Revenue: ▲190 million EUR (2009)
- Owner: Glacier
- Number of employees: 700 (2009)
- Parent: Davidson Kempner Capital Management; Afendis Capital Management
- Website: www.ysco.eu

Ysco is a Belgian ice cream producer that, since its founding in 1949, has become a prominent European leader in the production of frozen desserts. In 2009, it produced approximately 180 million litres of ice cream.

Ysco is a private label specialist supplying the largest European retailers but is also an important market player in the Foodservice sector with a range of own brands. Among the most notable own ice cream brands are Ysco and Appassionato.

In January 2025, it was announced that Ysco had been acquired by Glacier, an ice cream investment platform owned by Davidson Kempner Capital Management and Afendis Capital Management.

== History ==
1949	Start of ice cream production in Zarren
1975	Building of production hall in Langemark, production of 200 000 litre
1992	Foundation of Belgomilk cv
1998	Acquisition of OZF-Jamin icecream (Oosterhout, Netherlands)
2000	Ysco becomes an independent subsidiary of Belgomilk
2001	Acquisition of Ségès-Frigécrème ( Argentan, France )
2004	Investment in a new magnum line, Ysco achieves IFS higher level
2006	Transfer of the machinery in Oosterhout Towards Argentan and Langemark
2006	New mix plant in Langemark
2008	Investment in a new cone line, New automated coldstore in Ypres

== See also ==
- List of ice cream brands
