= Oostnieuwkerke =

Belgian village

Coordinates: 50°56′N 3°03′E

Oostnieuwkerke is a Belgian village in the province of West Flanders. It is part of the municipality of Staden. There are more than 3400 inhabitants and Oostnieuwkerke lies closer to the town Roeselare than it is to the main village Staden. The little river the Mandel flows through the centre of Oostnieuwkerke towards Roeselare.

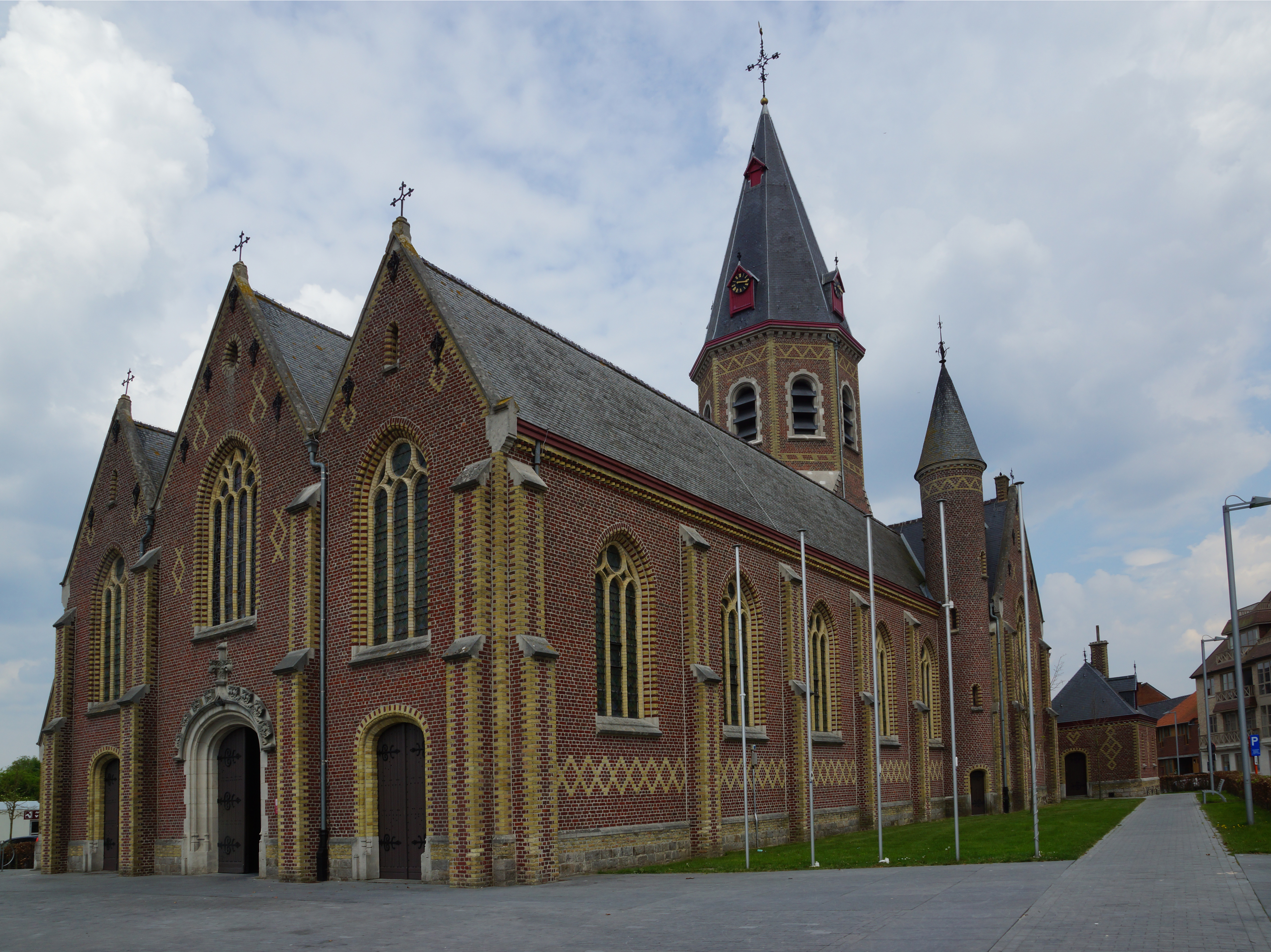
Onze-Lieve-Vrouwkerk, church of Oostnieuwkerke

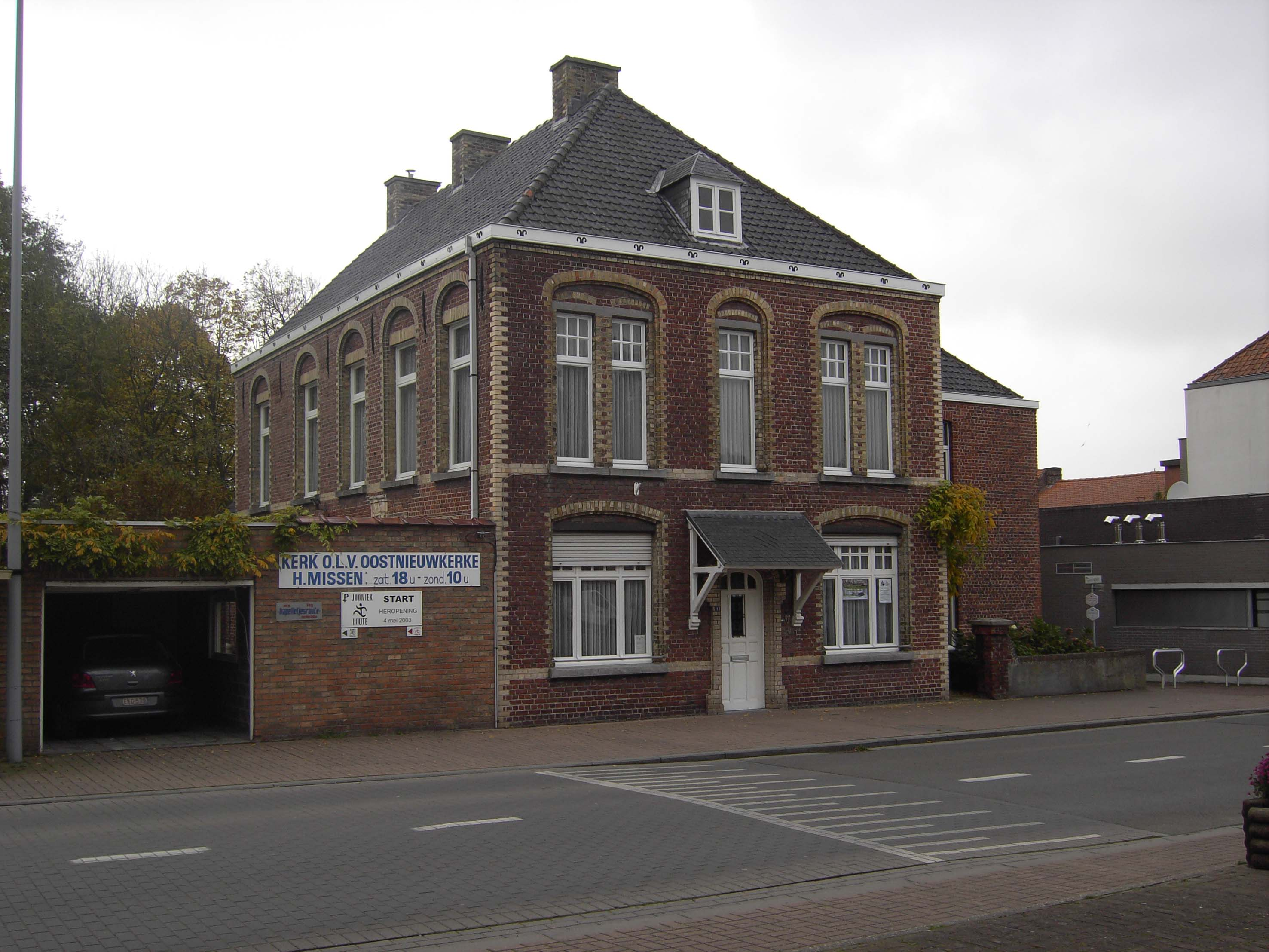
Rectory of the former priest

== History ==
While there are found some names like Nieukerka or Neuekerca referring to Oostnieuwkerke in old writings from the year 1093, Oostnieuwkerke only became a village in its current form after the French Revolution. In 1977, Oostnieuwkerke was merged with Staden.

Oostnieuwkerke has a neogothic church which has been restored in the 21st century. The church has beautiful stained glass, some old and some newer. The most recent one was made in 2010.

There used to be two primary schools in Oostnieuwkerke, but the mayor of Staden now rents (since 2010) the buildings to the monastery which made the two schools fall under one name and one director.

== Famous persons ==
- Maurice Blomme (1926–1980), cyclist
