= Kortemark =

Municipality in the province of West Flanders, Belgium

- Municipality
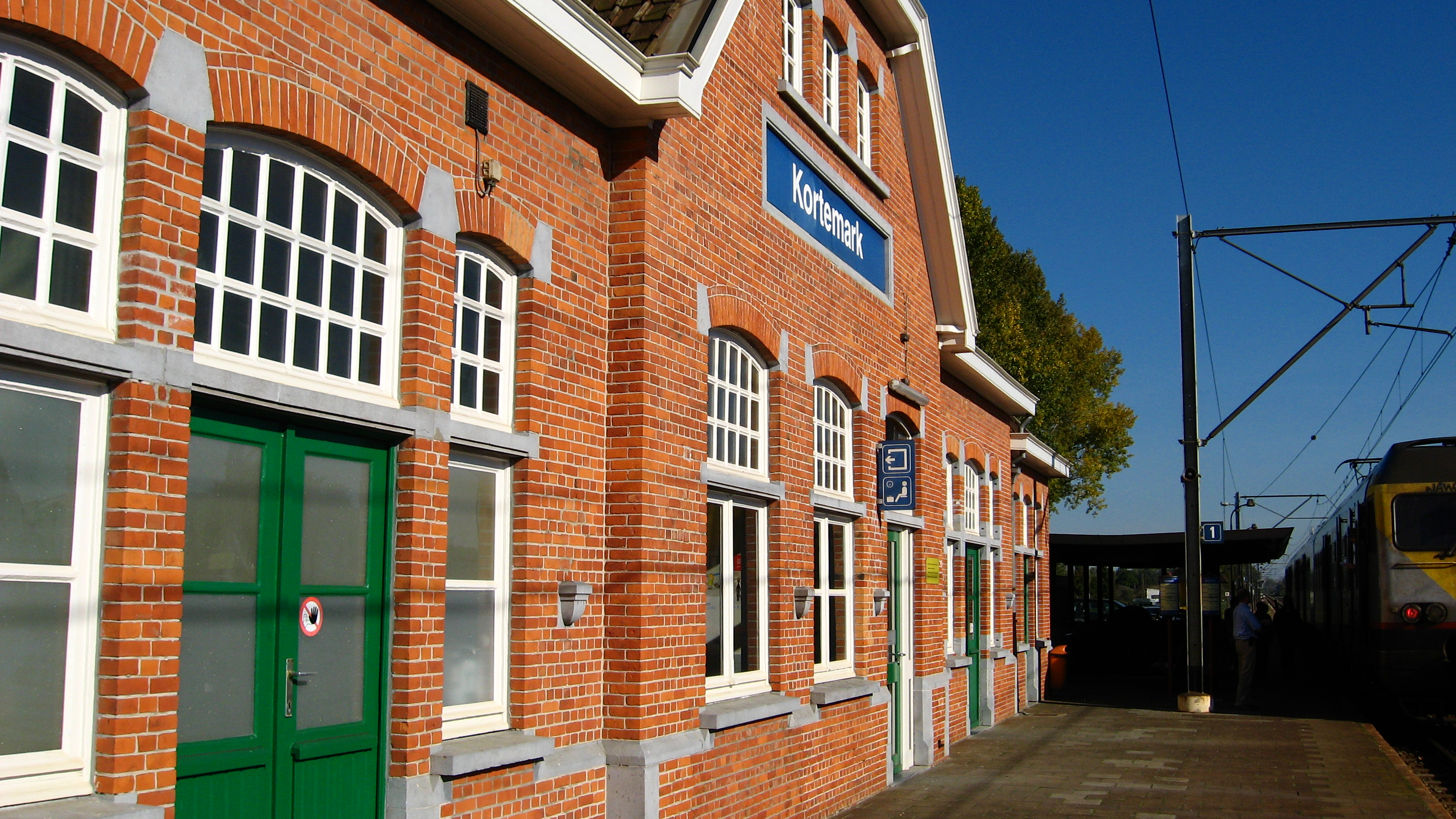

- Flag Coat of arms

- Location of Kortemark in West Flanders
- Interactive map of Kortemark
- Location in Belgium
- Coordinates: 51°02′N 03°02′E
- Country: Belgium
- Community: Flemish Community
- Region: Flemish Region
- Province: West Flanders
- Arrondissement: Diksmuide

Government
  - Mayor: Karolien Damman (CD&V)
  - Governing parties: Open Vld, CD&V

Area
  - Total: 55.43 km^{2} (21.40 sq mi)

Population (2018-01-01)
  - Total: 12,584
  - Density: 227.0/km^{2} (588.0/sq mi)
- Postal codes: 8610
- NIS code: 32011
- Area codes: 051
- Website: www.kortemark.be

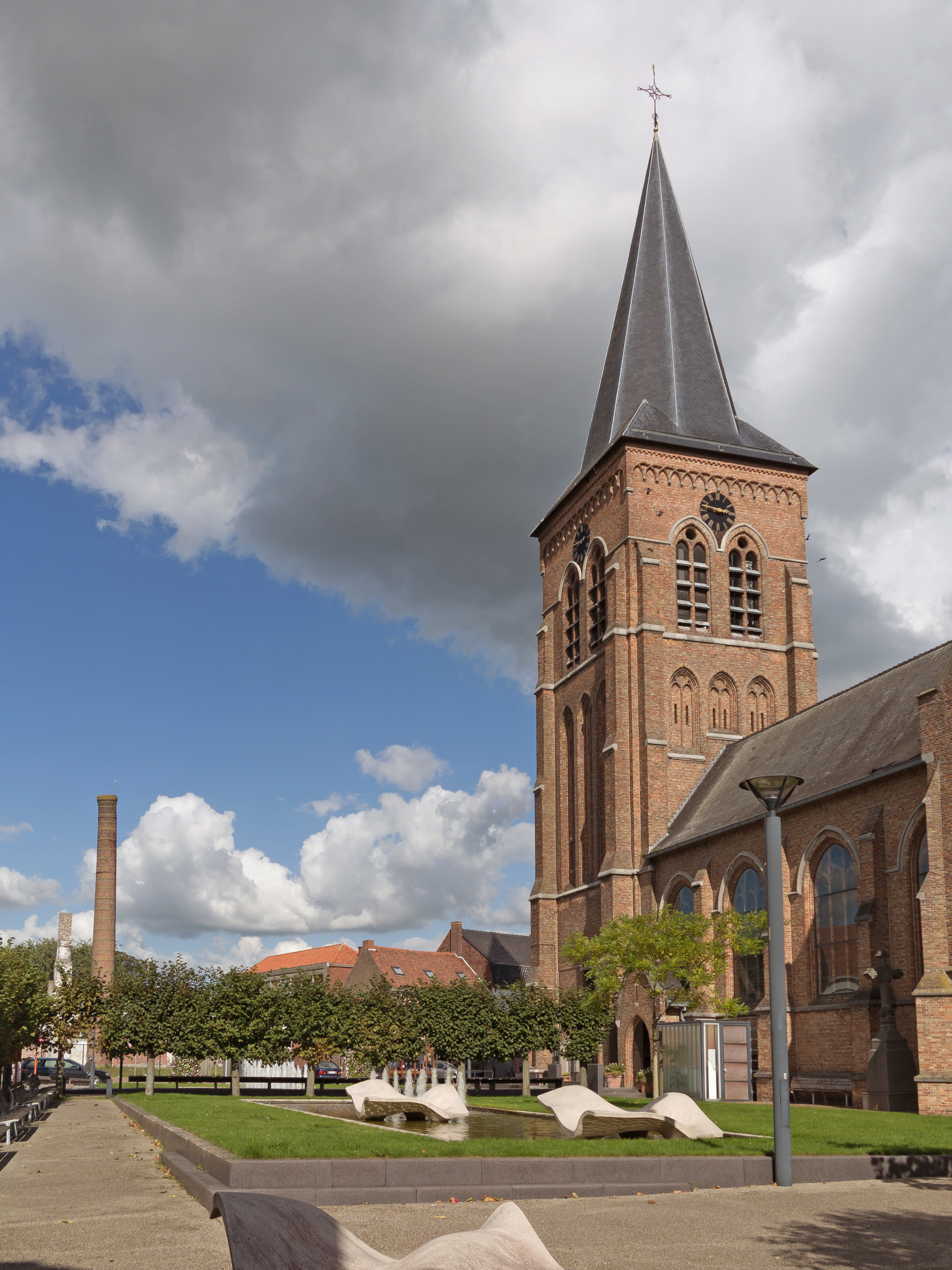
Kortemark, church: Sint-Bartholomeuskerk

Kortemark (Dutch pronunciation: [ˈkɔrtəmɑr(ə)k]), also previously Cortemarck, is a municipality located in the Belgian province of West Flanders. The municipality comprises the towns of Handzame, Kortemark, Werken and Zarren. On January 1, 2006, Kortemark had a total population of 11,976. The total area is 55.00 km^{2} which gives a population density of 218 inhabitants per km^{2}.

== Notable people ==
- Gustave Sap, politician, (Kortemark, 21 January 1886 - Brussels, 19 March 1940)
