= Werken =

Municipality in Flemish Community, Belgium

Werken Werken (Dutch)
- Municipality
- Location of Werken in West Flanders
- Interactive map of Werken
- Location in Belgium
- Coordinates: 51°02′N 2°57′E
- Country: Belgium
- Community: community
- Region: region
- Province: West Flanders
- Arrondissement: Kortemark
- Postal codes: 8610

Werken is a small rural village in the centre of the Belgian province of West Flanders with around a thousand inhabitants. It is a district of Kortemark.

== Origins of the name ==
The first mentions (Weretha) were found in texts from the Abbey of Sint-Bertinus in Sint-Omaars, dating from 830. The Old Dutch word "Weretha" dates from the time that the village of Werken was still on the sea-front, with a meaning equating to that of the English word 'haven' (the literal meaning would be "ashore on the water"). In modern Dutch werken (uncapitalised) is coincidentally the verb 'to work'.

== History ==
For a long time Werken was closely associated with the sea, in the low-lying area that is now called the Handzamevaart Valley - gradually reclaimed for around the year 1000 through the erection of dikes. Handzamevaart was under the influence of the tide until the twelfth century. The Mortagne family is recorded to have been in the area since the eleventh century, eventually becoming the lords of Werken - inhabiting a motte castle known as Hogen Andjoen (the 'high onion').

The Order of St.Clare founded a convent in 1286, and in 1295 the Cistercians of Hemelsdale Abbey moved their nuns to Werken (while the Clares relocated to Petegem). In 1578 the convent was destroyed during religious disputes, and the sisters returned to Bruges .

At the end of the seventeenth century, Werken also came under attack from French forces, the situation normalising in 1713. At Barisdam (a little to the east of the Werken-Zarren line) ships were able to moor, which caused some activity. In the 19th century there was also a shipping route to the market of Diksmuide.

From 1851 the Sisters of St.Vincent de Paul were based in Werken to provide education. In the second half of the nineteenth century there was also brewery and a gin distillery.

During the close of the First World War there was fighting around Werken and on October 16, 1918 the village was liberated. There were many demolitions, but the village was not completely ruined.

Until 1925 there was still shipping on the Handzamevaart. In 1943, the church was destroyed during the Second World War.

Werken merged with Zarren in the beginning of 1971 to form the municipality of Zarren-Werken, but this was abolished in early 1977 and added to the Kortemark merged municipality in the form of two sub-municipalities.

== Geography ==
The surface area of Werken is approximately 9.79 km², the majority of which is arable land.

The northern part of the borough is sloping (Sandy Flanders) with a highest point of 19 metres near Edewalle, and a lowest point of approximately 4 metres in the Handzamevaart valley. The surrounding bowl is approximately 7 metres high. Various streams, including the Calvebeek, flow to the southwest and waters into the Handzamevaart.

The Handzamevaart is a medium-sized stream that crosses Zarrenstraat and Steenstraat and eventually flows into the IJzer in Diksmuide. This stream runs through Werken by 'de Broeken', a flood plain now used for agricultural purposes. Between the Oude Gracht (Zarren) and the Handzamevaart there is a channel with a pumping station which systematically pumps excess water in to the Handzamevaart.

== Archaeological and historical sites ==
- The Hogen Andjoen (the "high onion") is a motte that dates from somewhere between the eighth and the ninth century.
- Saint Martinus Kerk, one of the first churches in the area — is about 20 metres from the motte. The original church made of wood dated from the eighth century, but has been rebuilt on several occasions in history. The present building was rebuilt after the first world war of 1918 in its original Roman style.
- The Archaeological Site Museum, with artefacts found during archaeological excavations at the motte.
- The Kruisstraat mill or Berghes mill, a stake mill from 1773.
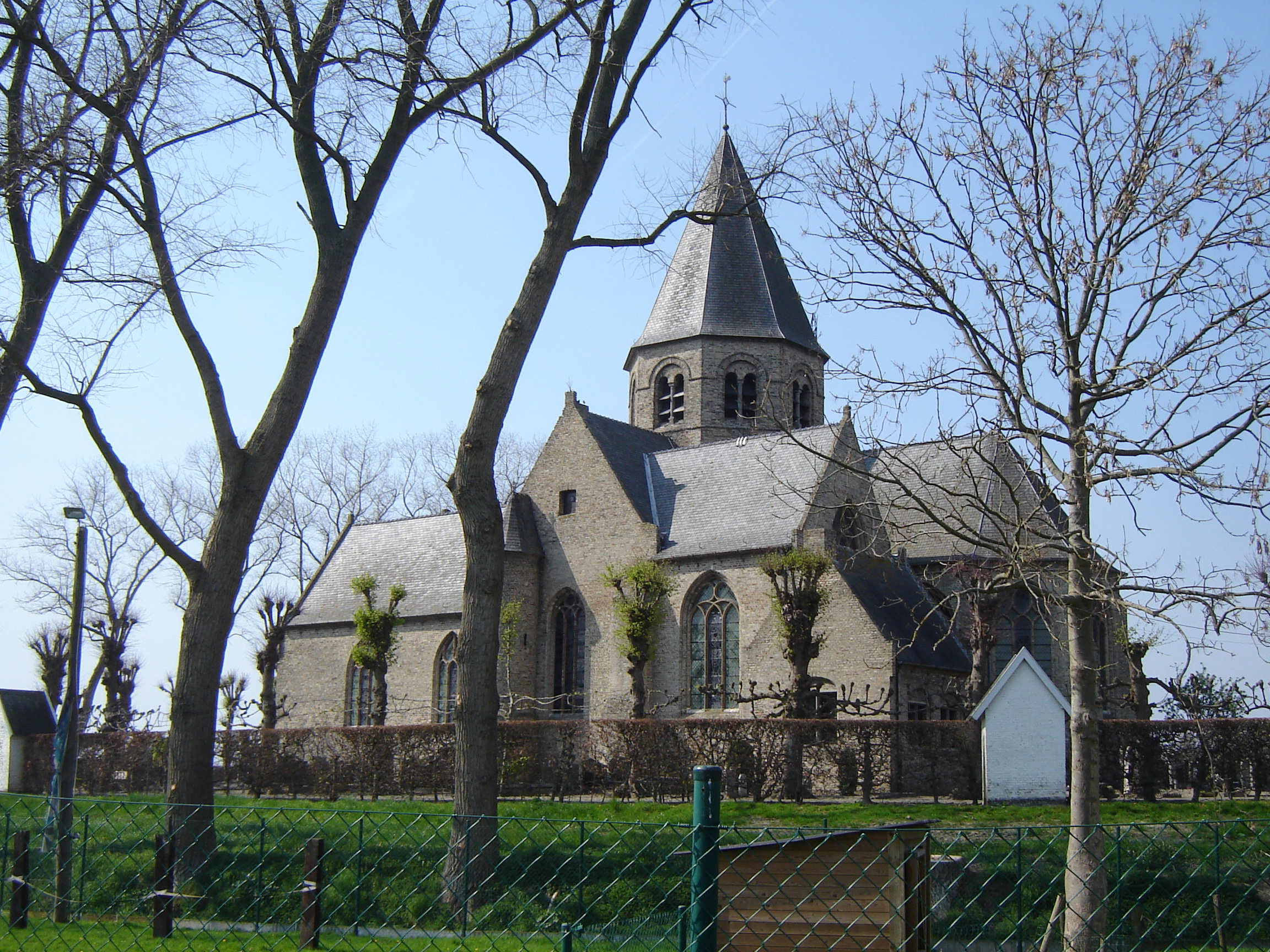
Saint Martin's Church

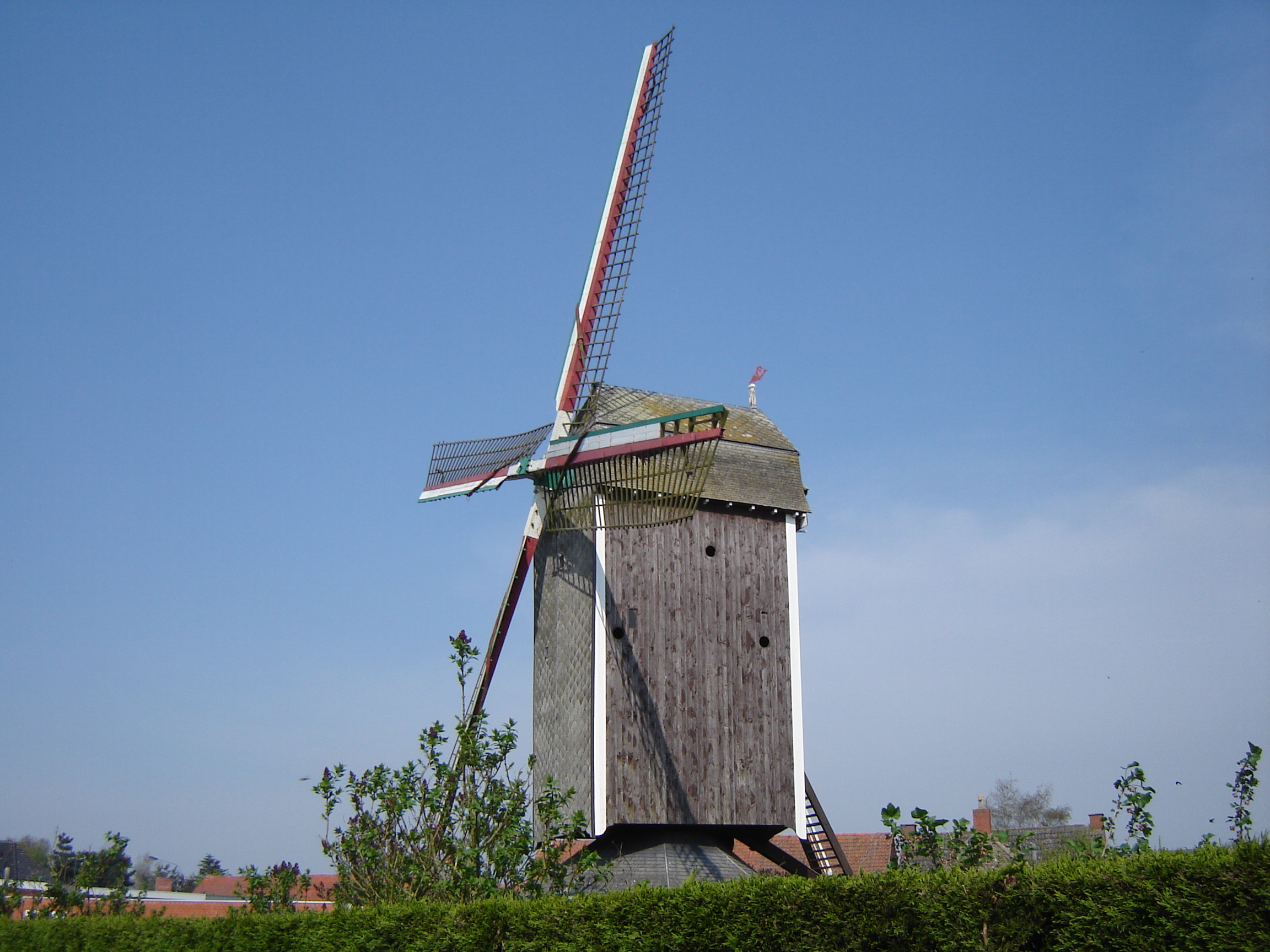
The cross-strut mill

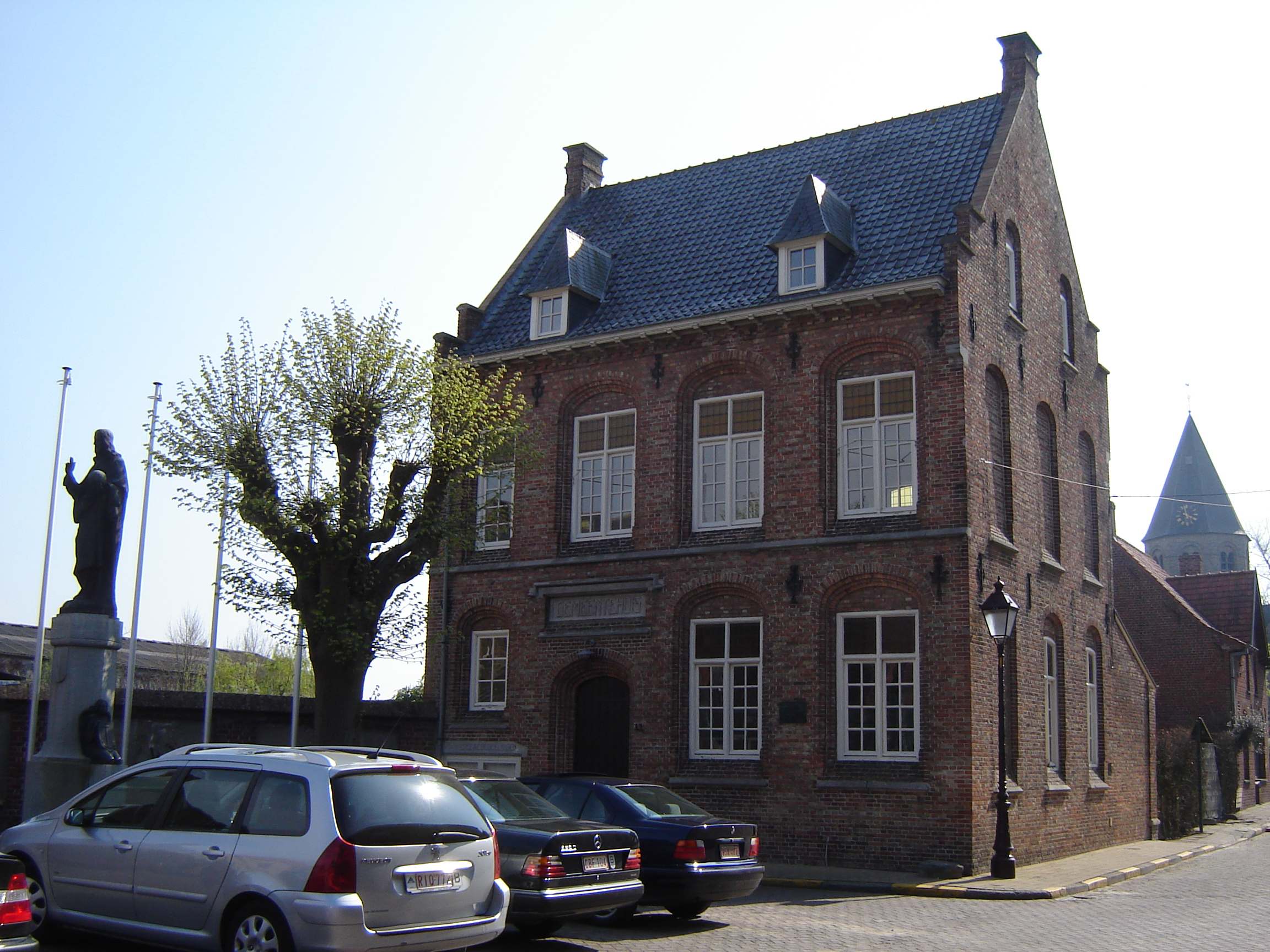
Town Hall

== Sources ==
- "Archeologisch Site-Museum". kortemark.be (in Dutch).
