= Zarren =

Town in Kortemark, West Flanders, Belgium

Coordinates: 51°01′N 2°57′E

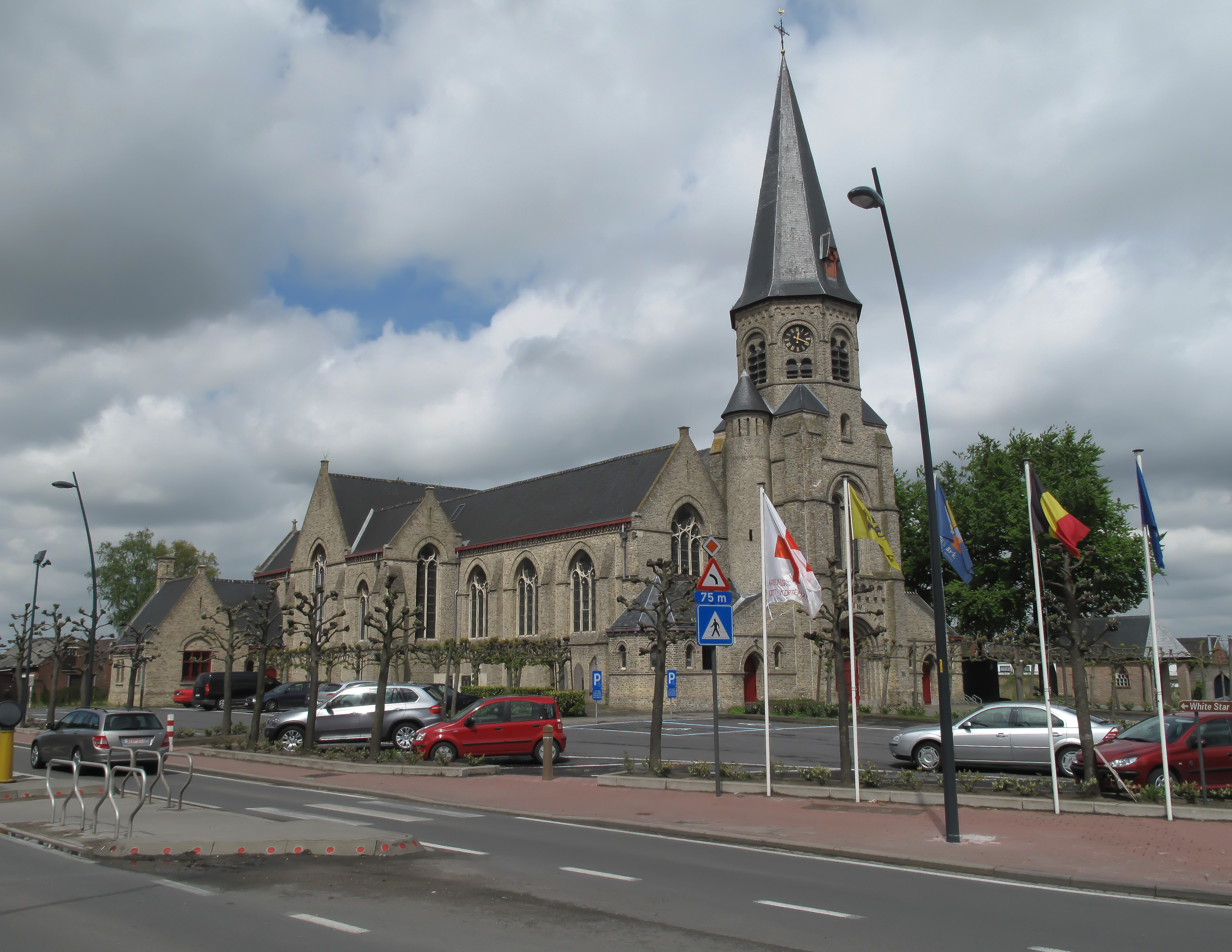
Zarren, church: de Sint Dionysiuskerk

Zarren is a town in Kortemark, West Flanders province, Belgium.

The ice cream manufacturer Ysco was founded here in 1949.
