= Jeu du Saint Sang =

Belgian passion play

Jeu du Saint Sang is a Belgian passion play, performed in Bruges. It was first published in 1938, and translated into French by Émile Schwartz. The custom is for the modern mystery play to be performed every fifth year, usually July or August, at the great market place in Bruges before the medieval cloth hall.

== See also ==
- Basilica of the Holy Blood

== Bibliography ==
- Joseph Boon. (1947).Sanguis Christi, Le jeu du Saint Sang de Bruges in three acts and a prologue, French translation Émile Schwartz, éd. Renouveau « La Source », Bruxelles,
