= Louis Delacenserie =

Belgian architect (1838–1909)

Louis Joseph Jean Baptiste Delacenserie
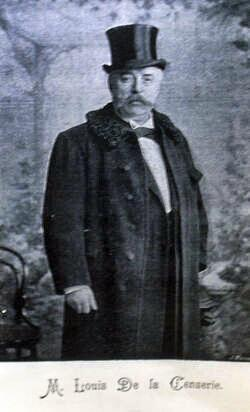
- Born: 7 September 1838; Bruges, Belgium
- Died: 2 September 1909 (aged 70); Bruges, Belgium
- Occupation: Architect
- Buildings: Central Station in Antwerp; Sint-Petrus-en-Pauluskerk in Ostend

Louis Delacenserie (1838–1909) was a Belgian architect from Bruges. The spelling of his name differs greatly; De la Censerie, Delasencerie, Dela Censerie or Dela Sencerie are the most common alternative forms. His father was a merchant and building contractor from Tournai.

Delacenserie studied architecture at the Académie of his native city under Jean-Brunon Rudd (1792–1870). He was a laureate of the Prix de Rome in 1862. This prize enabled him to travel to Paris, Italy and Greece where he could admire masterpieces of antique architecture. After his studies, he worked for a while in the office of Louis Roelandt, architect to the city of Ghent who worked in the neoclassical style.

In his early career, he adopted the neoclassical style of his teachers. After he was appointed architect to the city of Bruges, he became involved in the Belgian Gothic Revival movement. He led many "restorations" of the rich Gothic architectural heritage of his native city. This made him familiar with the Gothic brick and sandstone architecture of medieval Flanders. Thanks to his profound knowledge of medieval architecture, he was able to imitate this historic style in all its details, although he often used new construction techniques and materials in his own original creations.

At the pinnacle of his career, Delacenserie made the designs for the Central Station in Antwerp. In this design he made use of a rather eclectic Neo-Renaissance style that refers to the economic and artistic prime of the city in the 16th century. Some aspects of this edifice, like the use of colours and materials, were clearly influenced by Art Nouveau architecture.

== Works ==
Some restoration projects in Bruges:

- Basilica of the Holy Blood (1870–77)
- Tolhuis (1879)
- Hof van Gruuthuse (Gruuthusemuseum) (1883–95) (east and south wings)
- City Hall and Belfry of Bruges (1894–95 and 1903–04)
- Sashuis (1895–97)
- Poortersloge (1899–1903)
- West front of the Church of Our Lady (1905–09)

Some of his new original projects:

- City Hall of Diksmuide (1877–1900)
- Castle Bloemendale, Beernem (1878)
- Palace of the Provincial Council (Provinciaal Hof) in Bruges
- School (Normaalschool) in Bruges (1880–83)
- Nieuw Sint-Janshospitaal (New Saint-Johns Hospital) in Bruges
- Sint-Petrus-en-Pauluskerk in Ostend (1899–1905)
- Post Office in Bruges (1901–05)
- Central Station of Antwerp (1895–1905)
- Belgian legation building in Beijing Legation Quarter (1902)
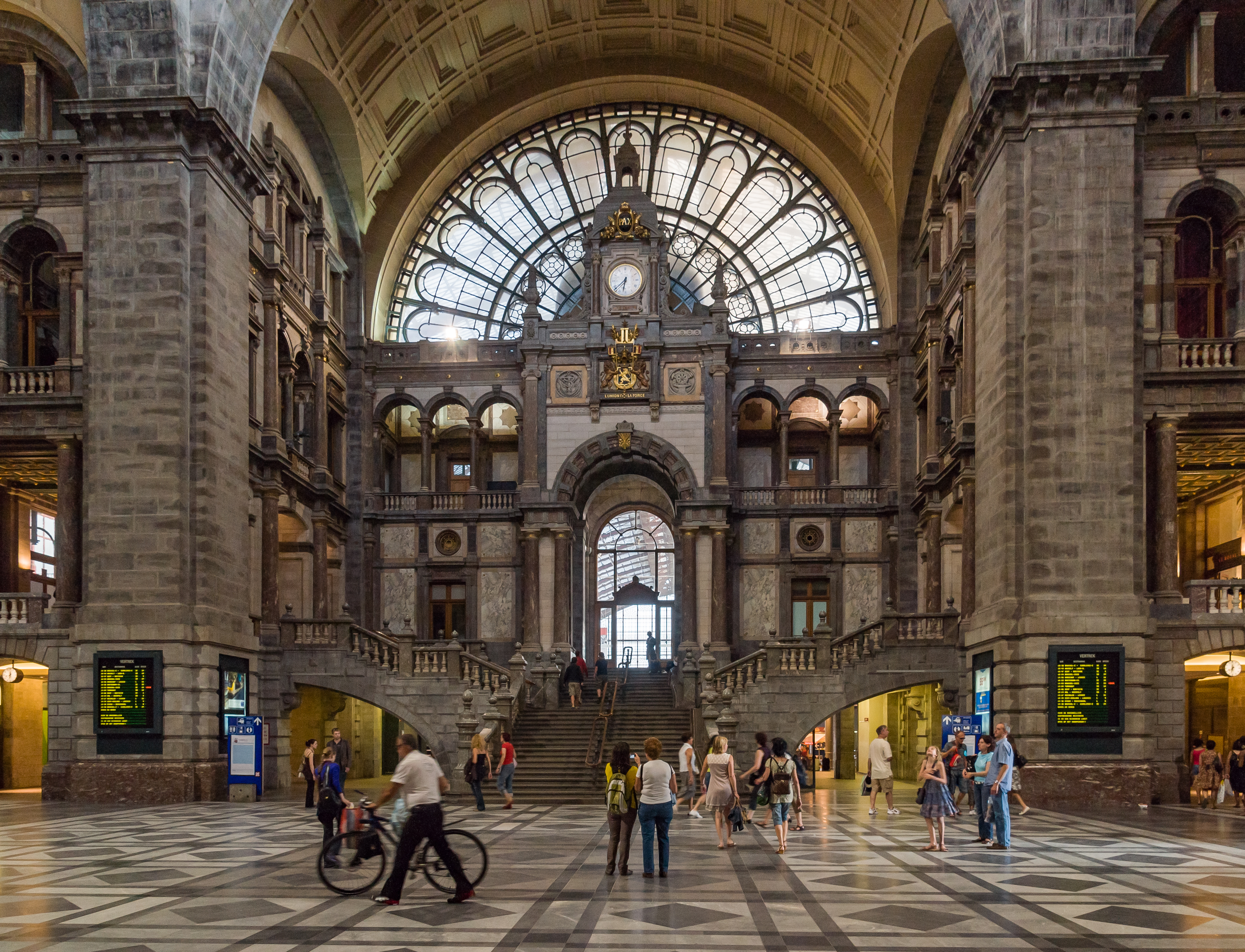
Entrance hall at Antwerp Central Station

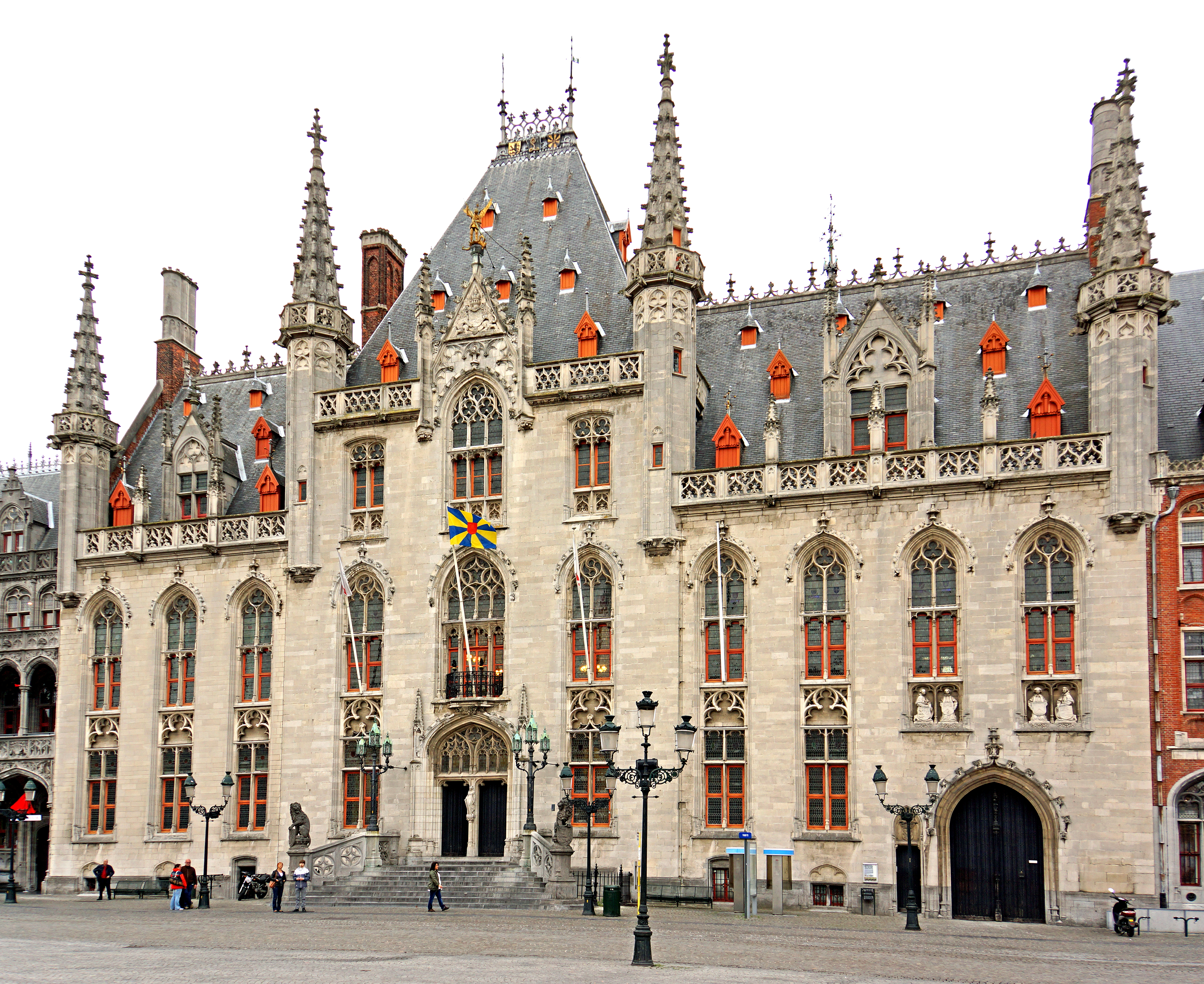
Provinciaal Hof (Provincial Court) in Bruges

Sint-Petrus-en-Pauluskerk in Ostend
