= Sint-Petrus-en-Pauluskerk =

Church in Ostend, Belgium

Church of St. Peter and St. Paul
- Dutch: Sint-Petrus-en-Pauluskerk
- Eastern facade
- Church of St. Peter and St. Paul
- 51.230°N 2.922°E
- Location: Ostend
- Country: Belgium
- Denomination: Roman Catholic

Architecture
- Functional status: Active
- Architectural type: Church
- Style: Neo-Gothic
- Groundbreaking: 1899
- Completed: 1908

Sint-Petrus-en-Pauluskerk (Church of Saint Peter and Saint Paul) is a Roman Catholic church in Ostend, Belgium. The neo-Gothic building was constructed on the ashes of a previous church that occupied the site. King Leopold II enthusiastically supported a plan to build a new and more magnificent church. Construction started in 1899 and was completed and consecrated by Bishop Waffelaert on 31 August 1908. Its stained glass windows were destroyed during the two World Wars and were replaced by Michiel Martens. The church is 70 metres (230 ft) long and 30 metres (98 ft) wide. Its spires are 72 metres (236 ft) high. It is visible from the Ostend railway station.

The church was built in the neo-Gothic style according to plans by the architect Louis Delacenserie, who based his design on the Gothic Cologne Cathedral and the neo-Gothic Votivkirche in Vienna.

The tomb of Queen Louise-Marie, who died in Ostend, is housed at the very front of the main altar and may be visited upon request.

Outside the church there is also the War Victims Monument.

== Gallery ==
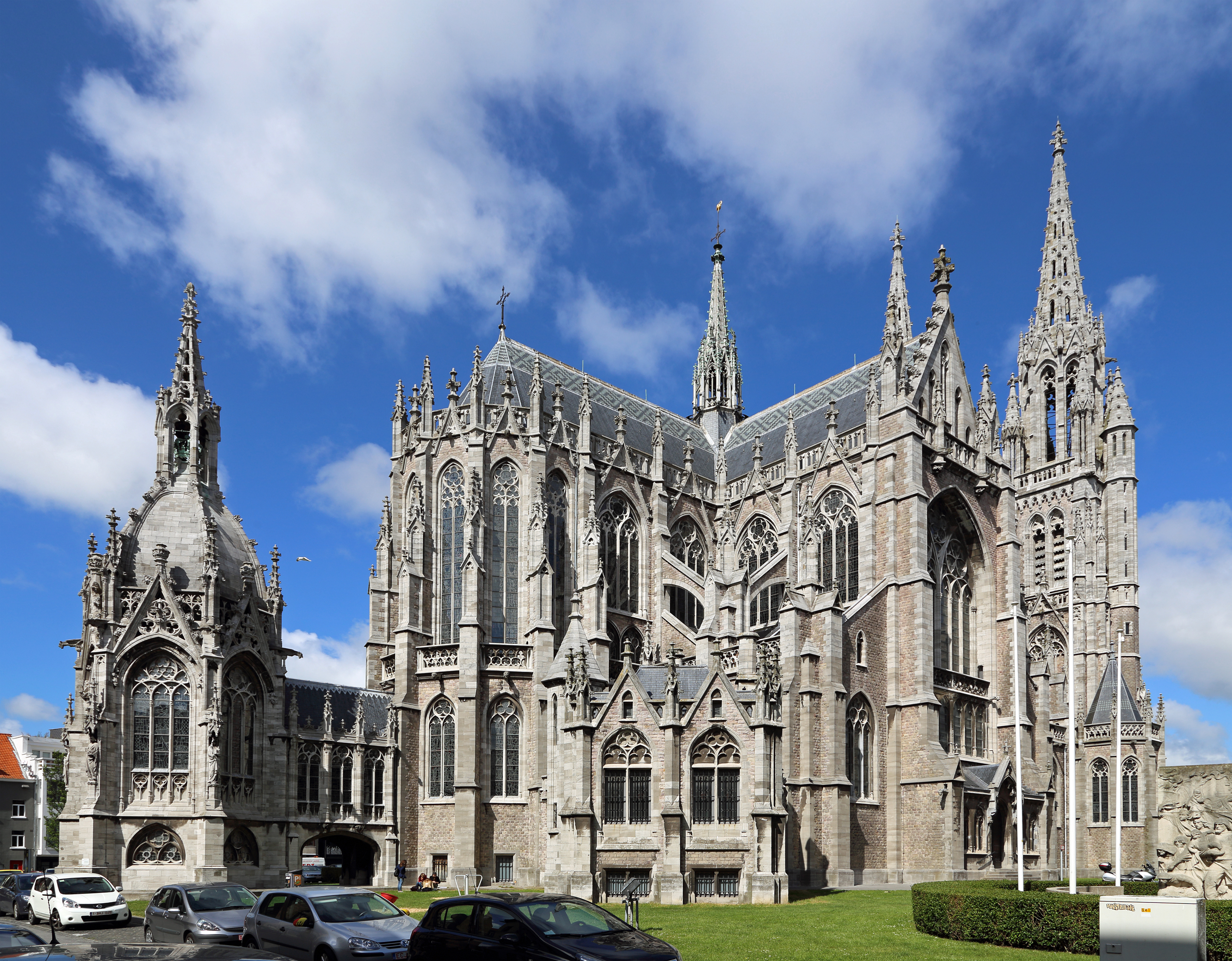
View from the south-west

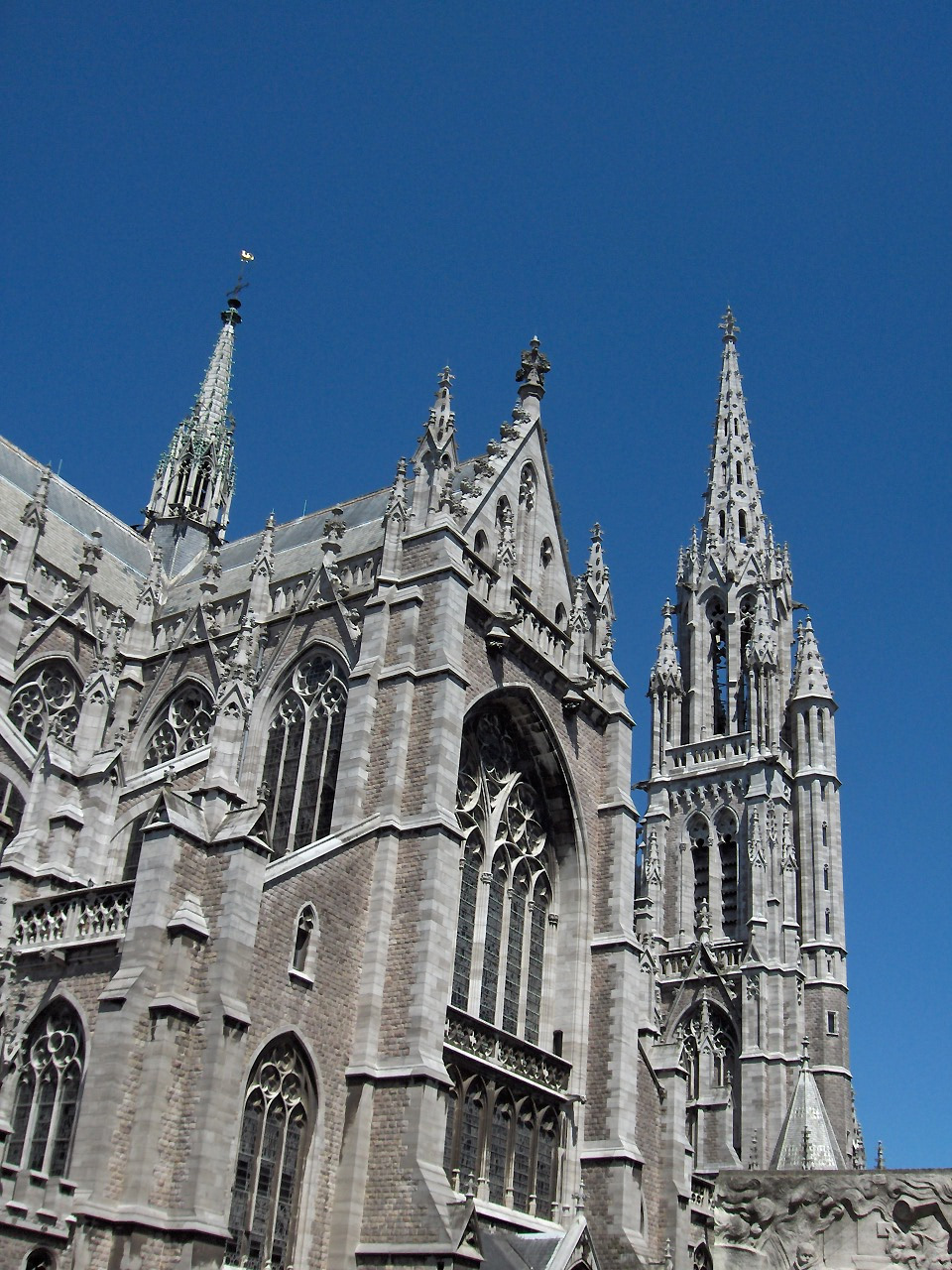
Side view

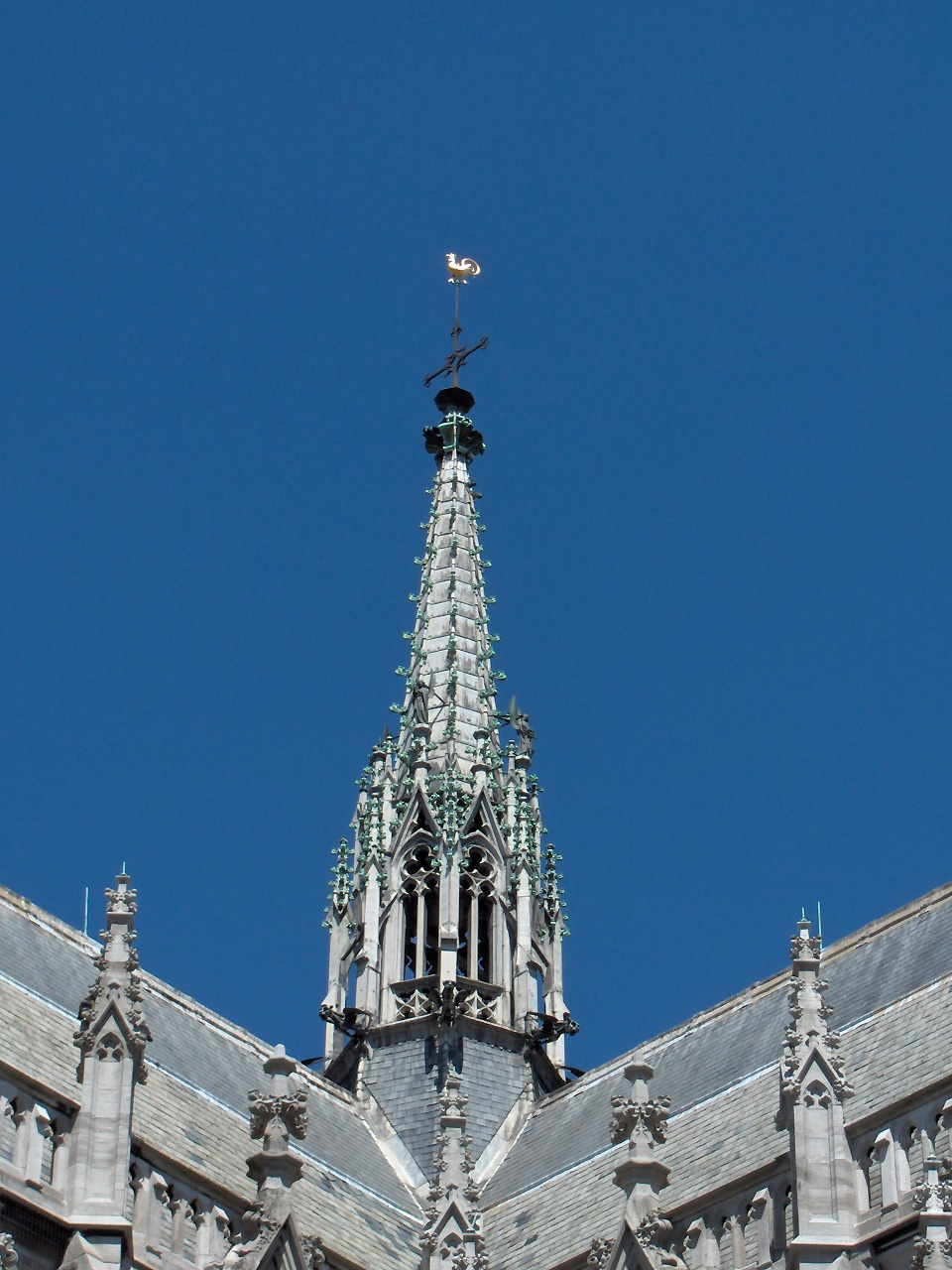
Pinnacle

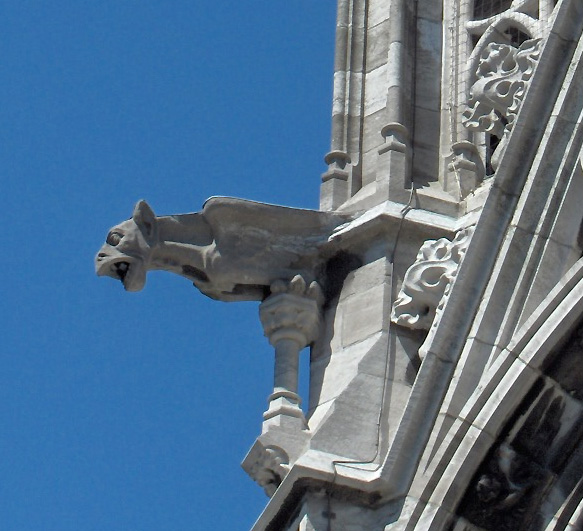
Gargoyle

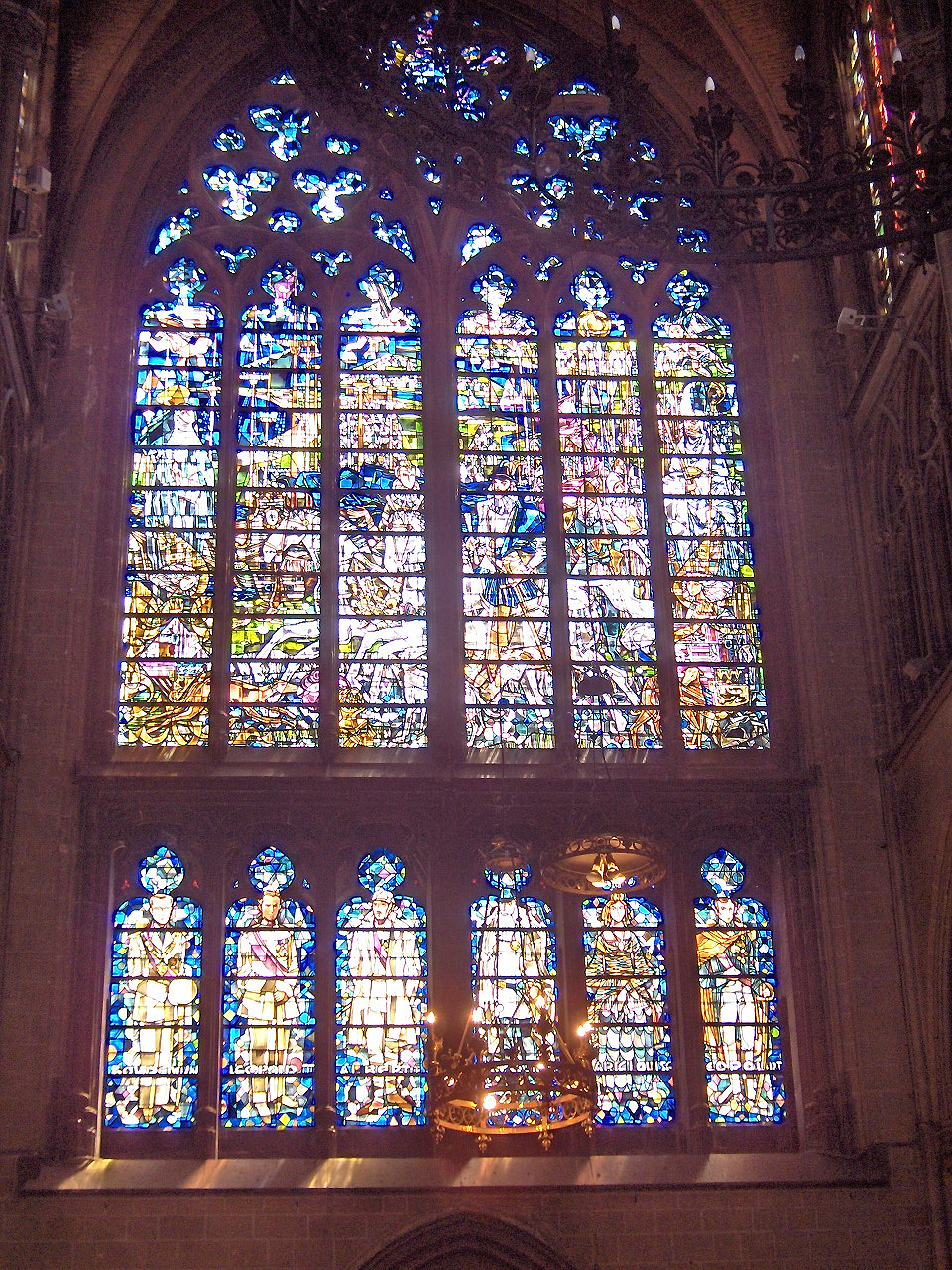
Stained glass window

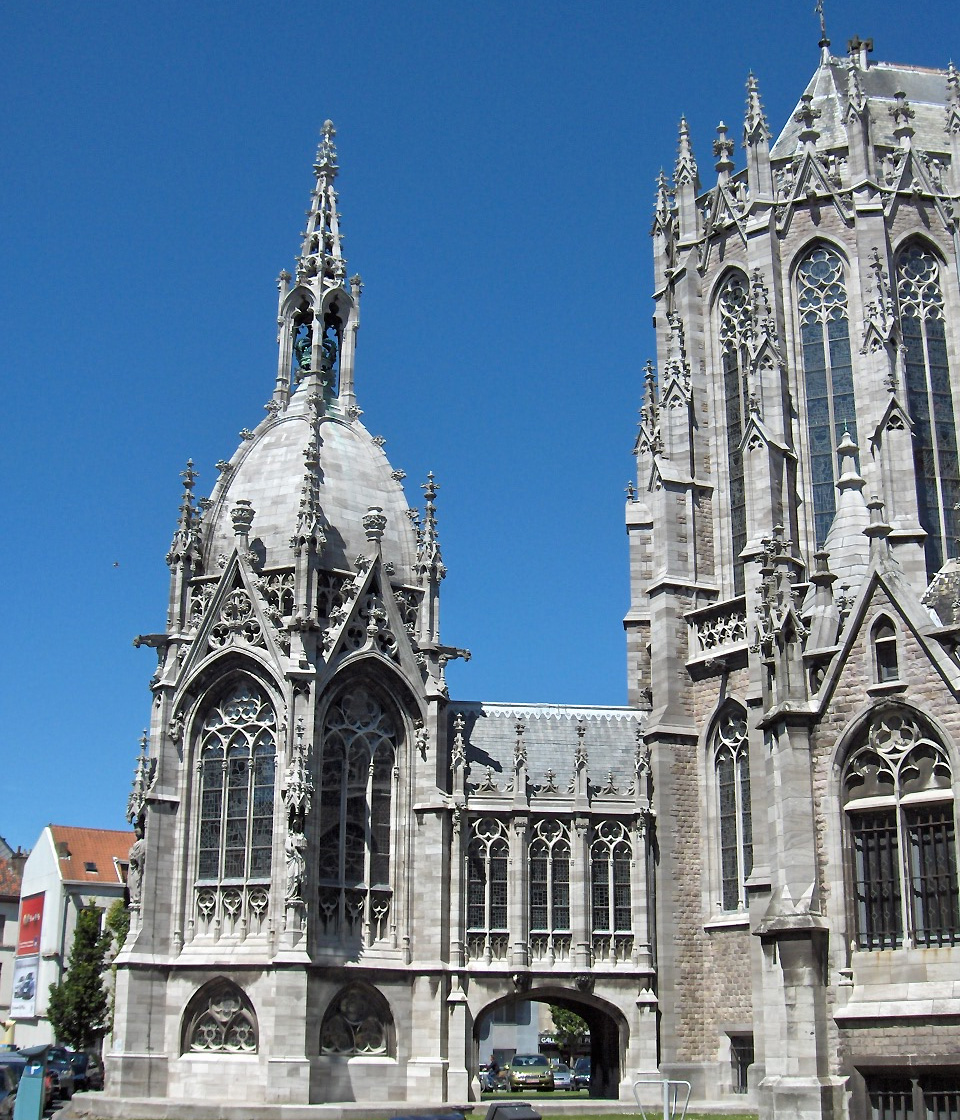
Mausoleum for Queen Louise-Marie

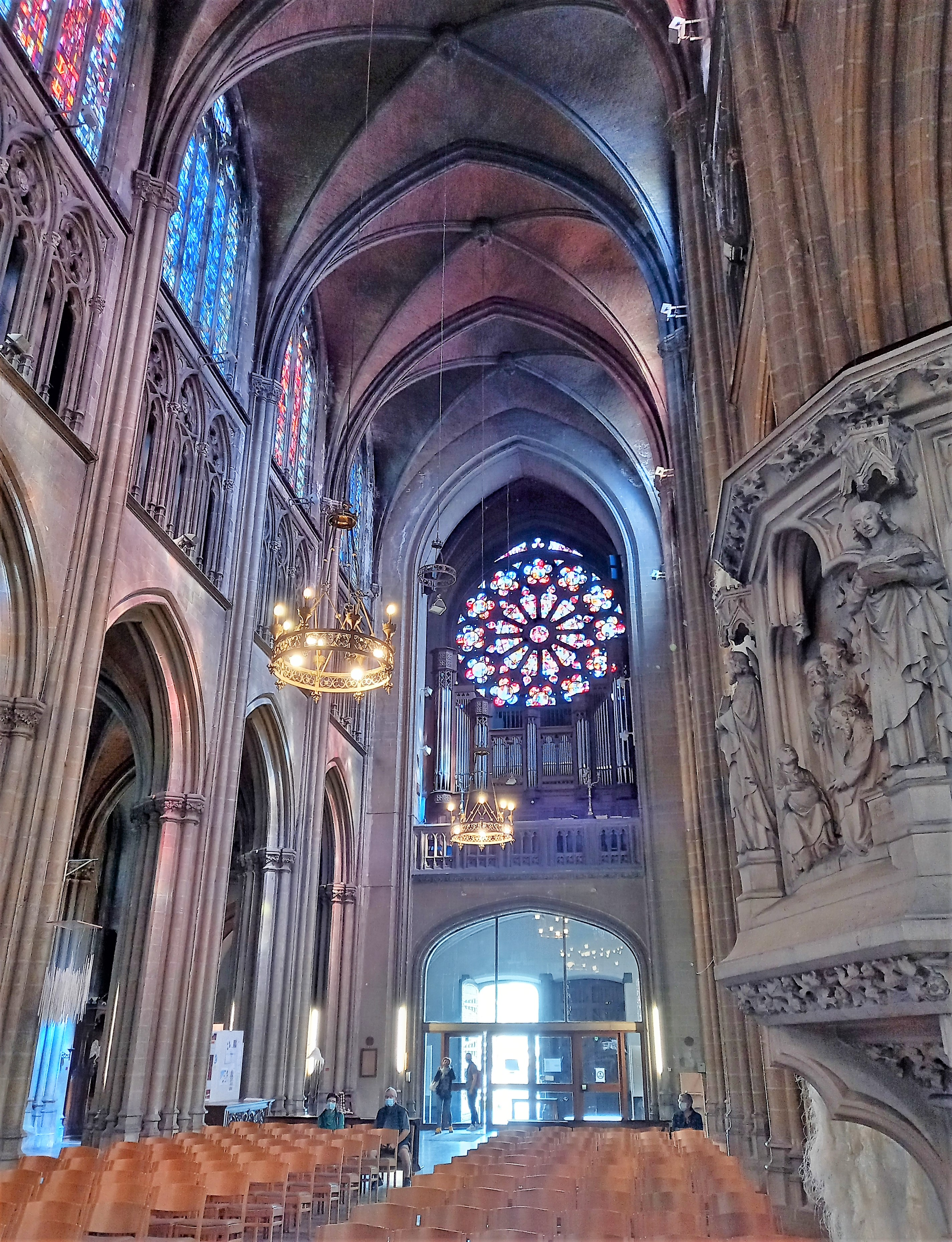
Central nave of the church

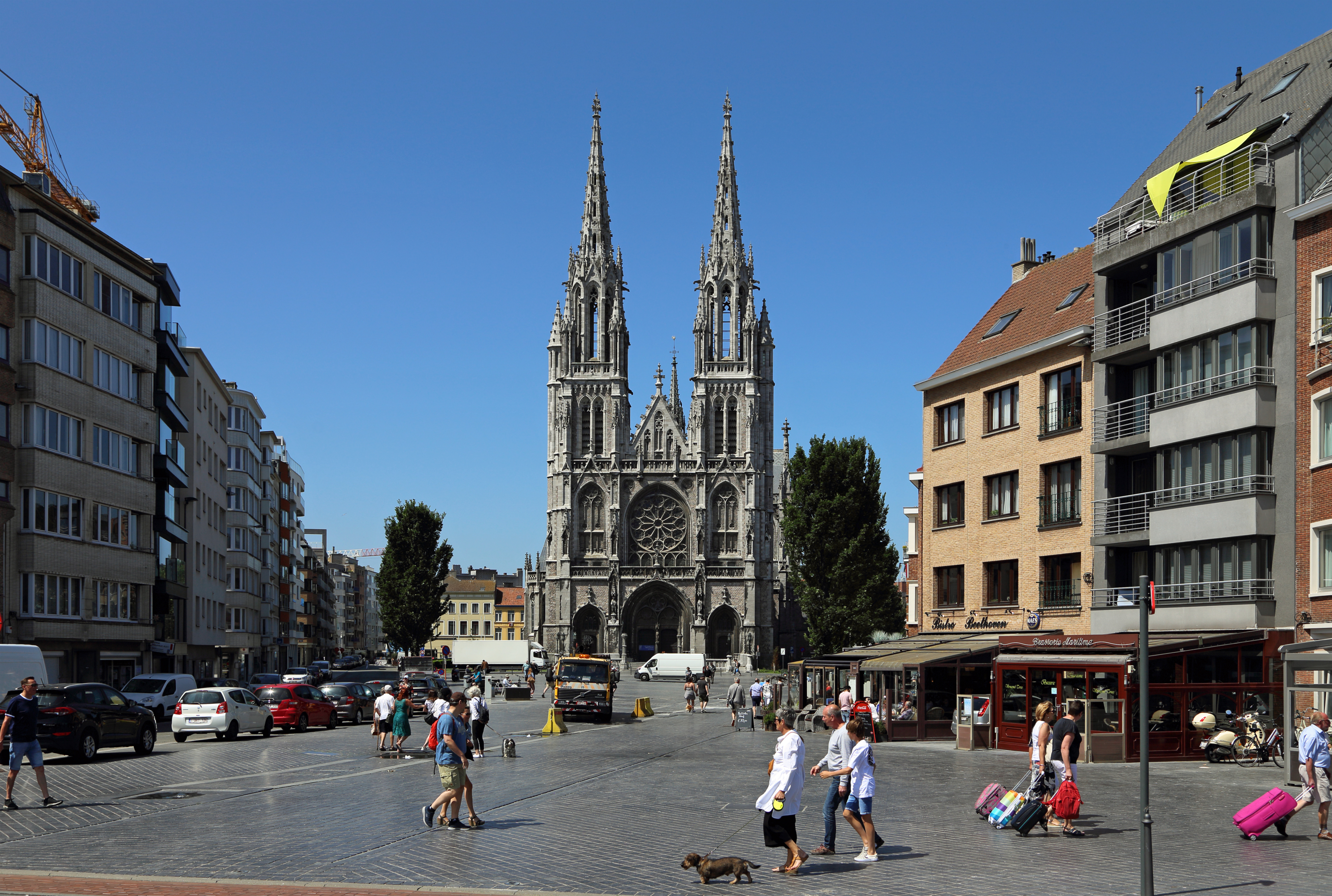
Distant view showing the Petrus- and Paulusplein square outside of the church

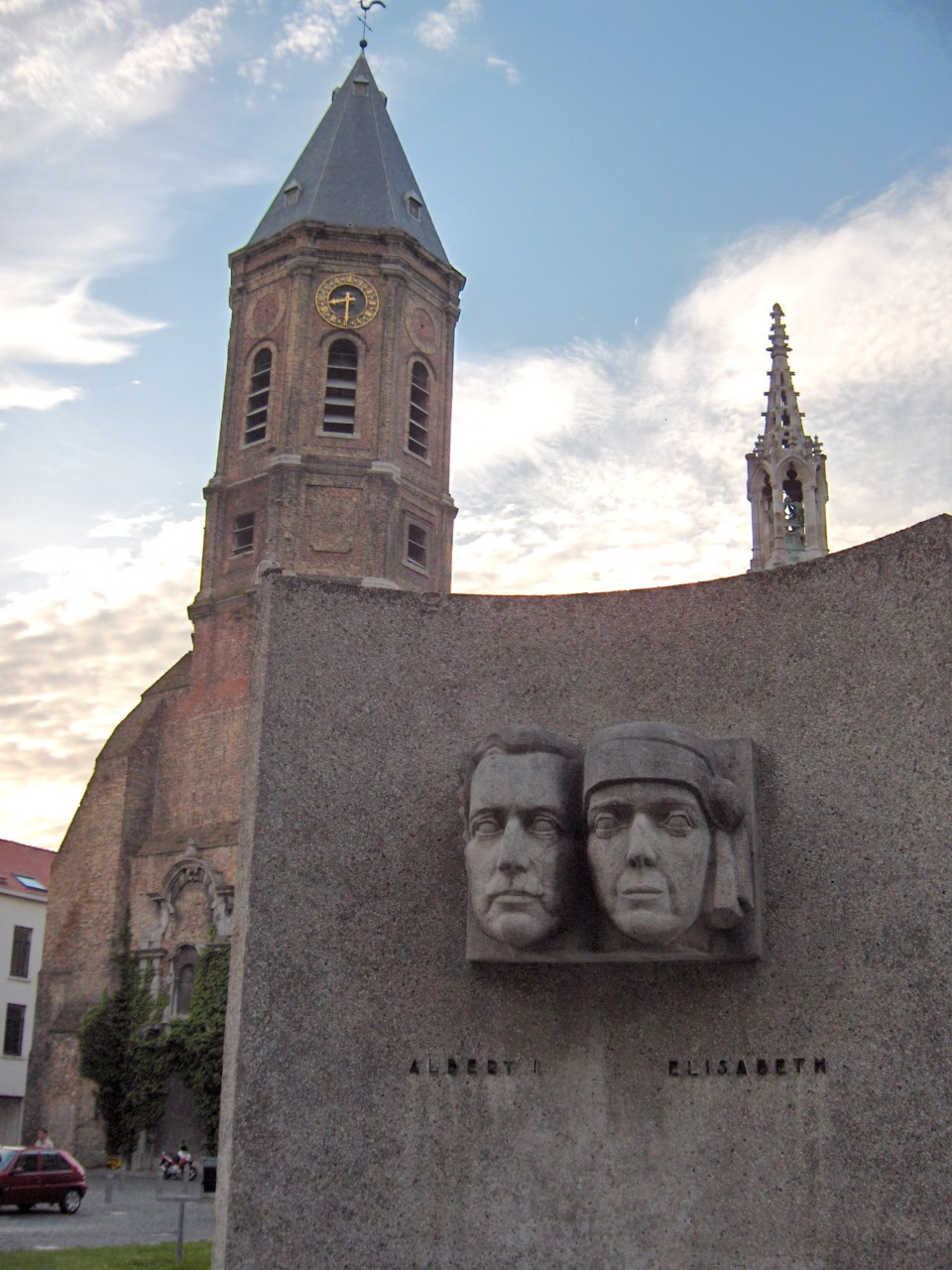
War victims monument
