= Provinciaal Hof =

Building in Bruges, Belgium

Coordinates: 51.2089°N 3.2252°E

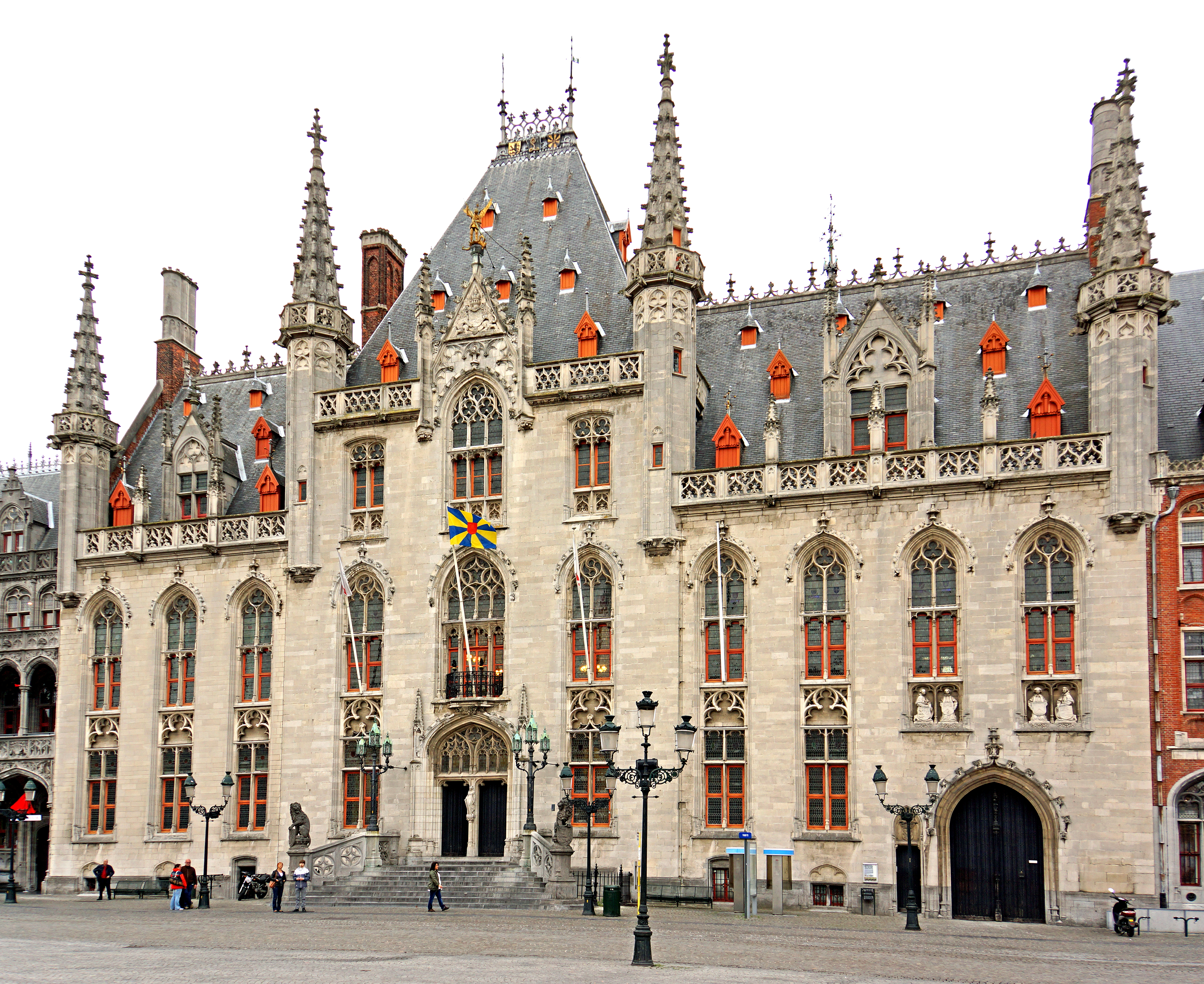
The Provinciaal Hof (Provincial Court) on the Markt of Bruges

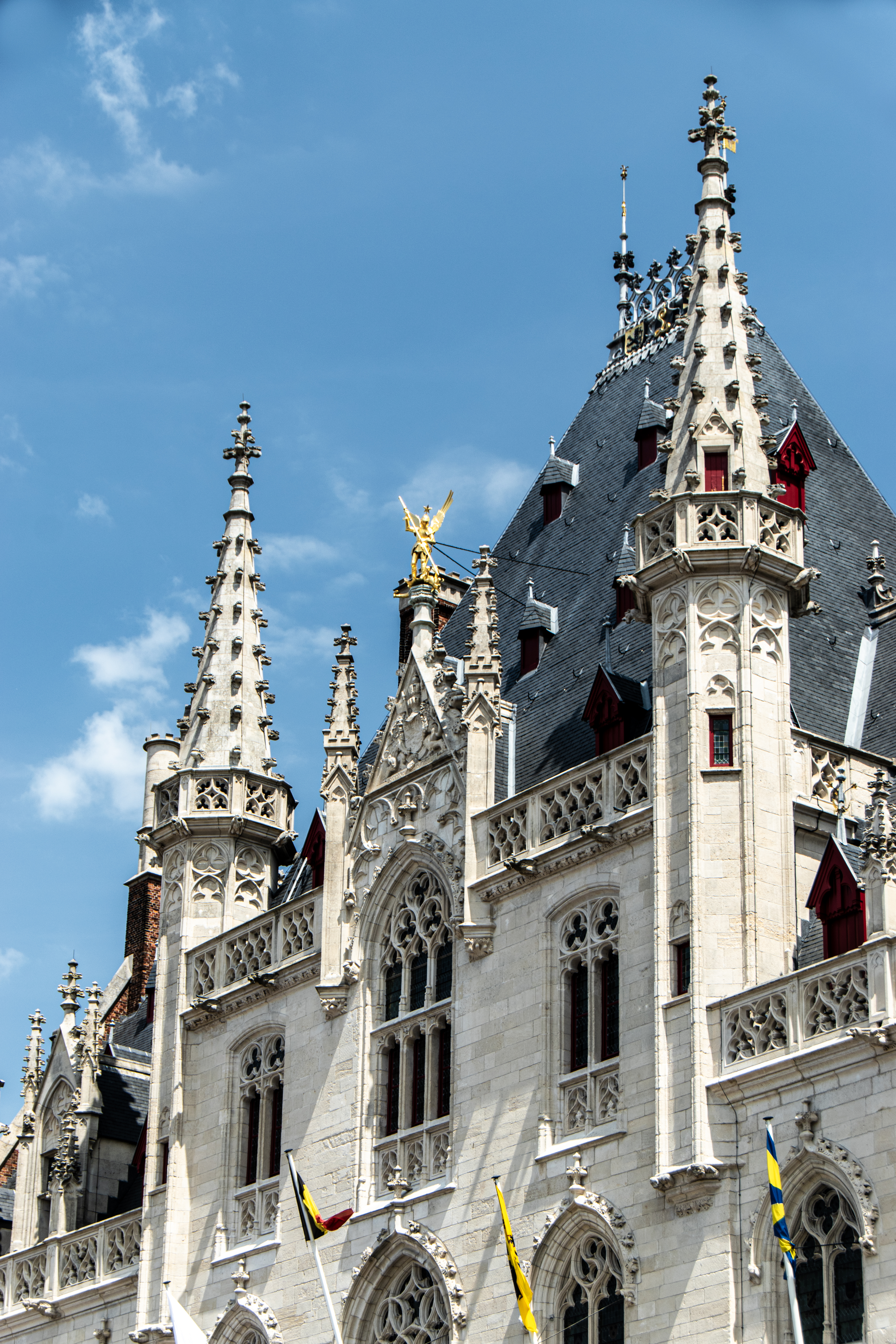
Main spires

The Provinciaal Hof (English: Provincial Court) is a neo-Gothic building on the Markt (main square) in Bruges, Belgium. It is the former meeting place for the Provincial Government of West Flanders.

== History ==
In 1294, the Waterhalle, 95 metres (312 ft) long and about 30 metres (98 ft) high, was built as the central point of the port of Bruges, right in the heart of the city. When the boats no longer could reach the hall, it was demolished in 1787 and replaced with a neoclassical building. From 1850 on, part of this was used to house the provincial government meetings, until it burned down in 1878. A replacement in neo-Gothic style, intended to house the province and a postal office, was started in 1887 by the architects Louis Delacenserie and René Buyck. The post office was opened in 1891, and the first part of the Provinciaal Hof in 1892. The last parts of the buildings were finished in 1920.

The building was used as the government meeting hall until 1999, and is now mainly a ceremonial building, and also used for exhibitions. In 2012, the Federal Government, which owns the building, was considering to sell it, but the Provincial Government, the main user of the Hof, protested.

== Building ==
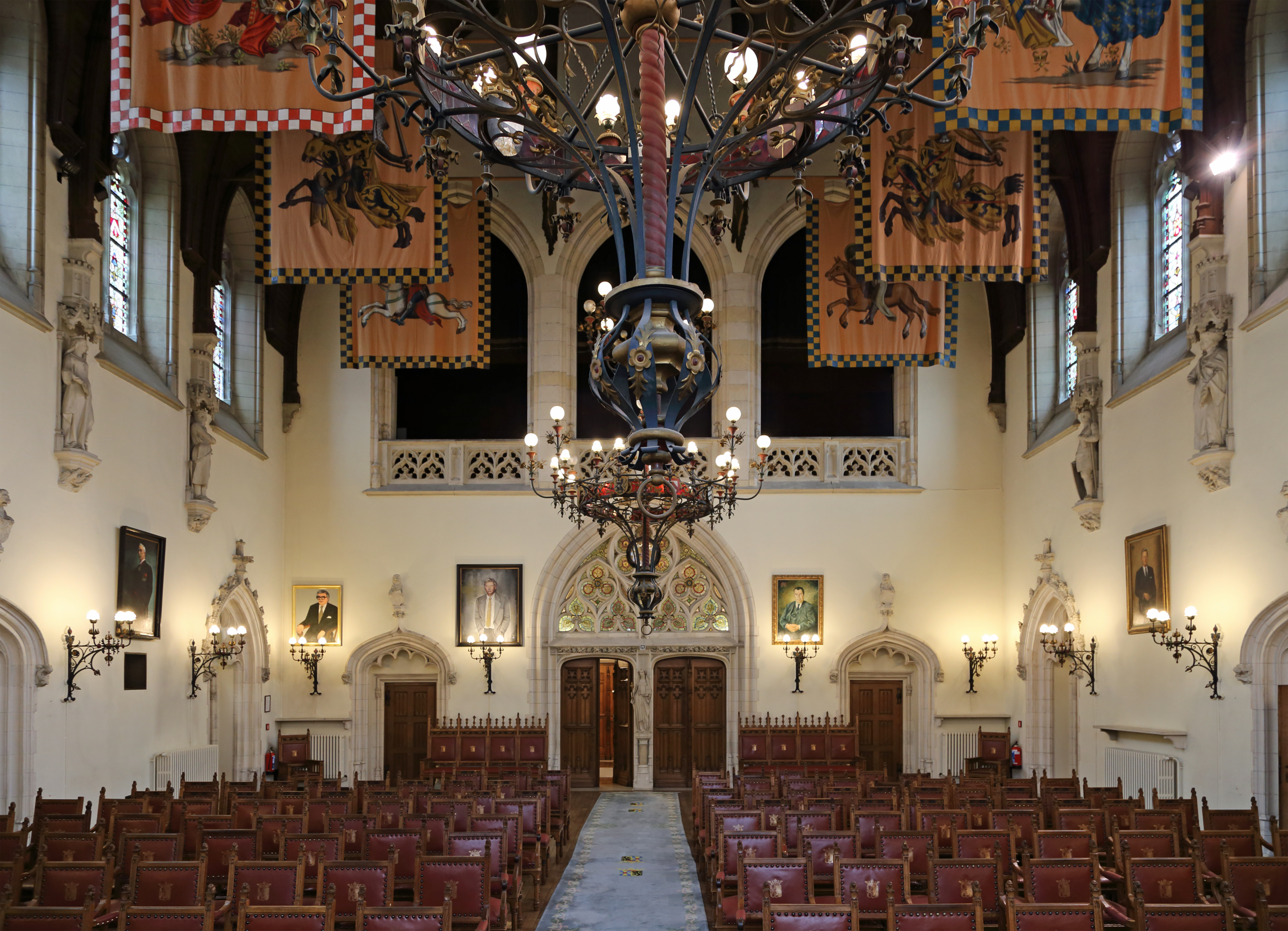
The Provincial Council Room

Both the exterior and the interior are in the Gothic Revival style. The central meeting room has ten sculptures of royalty by Hendrik Pickery, and mural paintings of famous people from West Flanders. The rest of the building is decorated with more sculptures by Hendrik and his son Gustaaf Pickery, stained glass windows by Jules Dobbelaere, and chandeliers by Edward De Vooght. A number of paintings can be found as well, including work by Joos de Momper, Jan Van de Putte, Jan Baptist van Meunincxhove, and paintings from the Romantic era.
