= Cranenburg House =

Building in Bruges, Belgium

Coordinates: 51.20862°N 3.22364°E

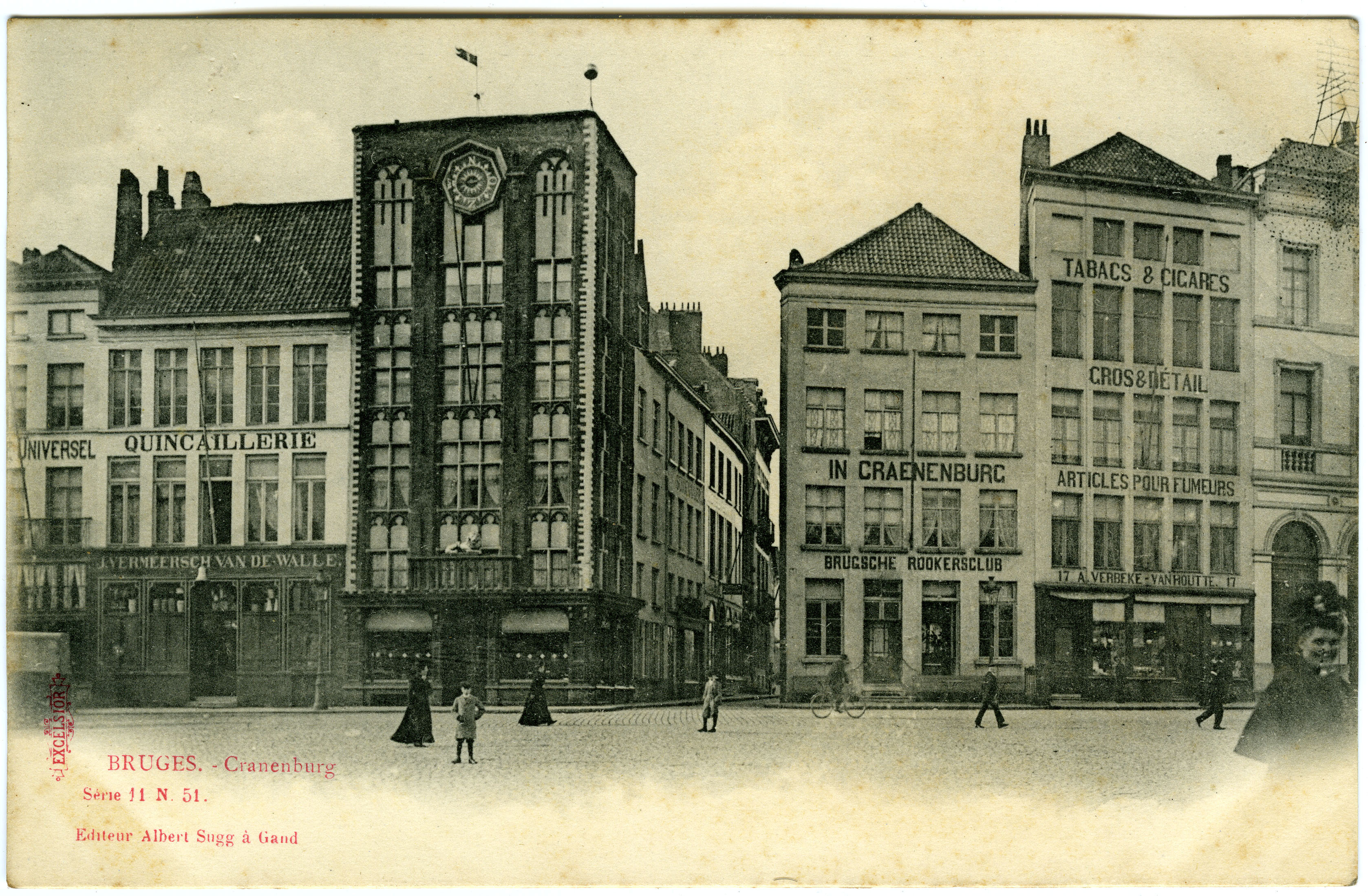
The Cranenburg House (right of centre) from a postcard, c. 1905

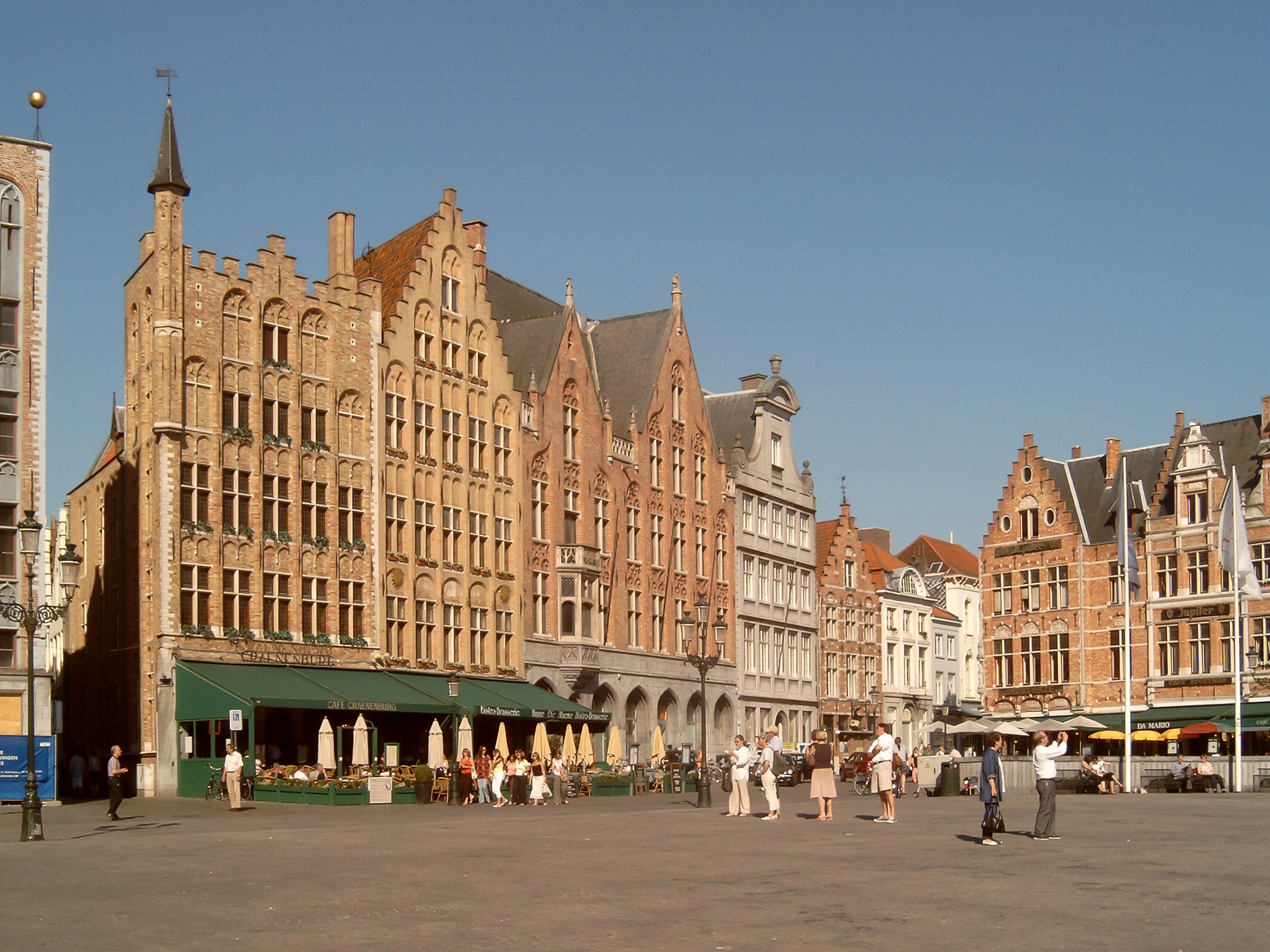
Modern restaurant/café conversion (left) in 2007

The Cranenburg House (also Craenenburg) is a historic building located on the Markt (main square) of Bruges, Belgium. In the 15th century, it was a favourite residence of Mary of Burgundy and Maximilian I, Holy Roman Emperor, near which he organised tournaments, and also the place in which he was imprisoned for four weeks in 1488. The building is now a café with a historicised façade by M. Vermeersch from 1956.

George W. T. Omond's Bruges and West Flanders (1906), illustrated by Amédée Forestier, refers to the building: Cranenburg, from the windows of which, in olden times, the Counts of Flanders, with the lords and ladies of their Court, used to watch the tournaments and pageants for which Bruges was celebrated, and in which Maximilian was imprisoned by the burghers in 1488. But the Cranenburg, once the 'most magnificent private residence in the Market-Place,' many years ago lost every trace of its original splendour, and is now an unattractive hostelry, the headquarters of a smoking club; while the Hôtel de Bouchoute, turned into a clothier's shop, has little to distinguish it from its commonplace neighbours.
