= Markt, Bruges =

Square in Bruges, Belgium

Markt
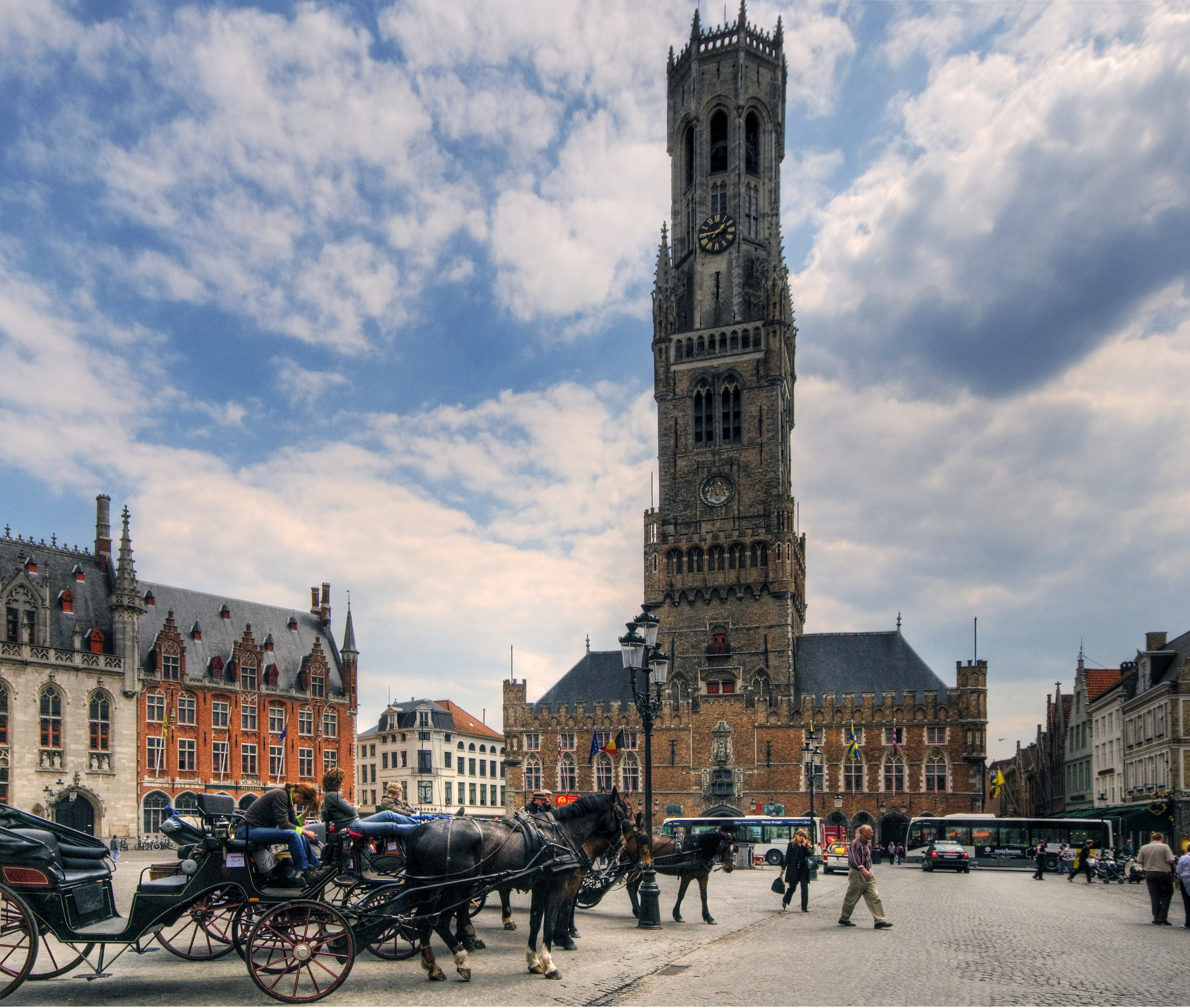
- The Markt and Belfry in Bruges, Belgium

- Location within Belgium
- Location: Bruges, West Flanders, Belgium
- Coordinates: 51°12′30″N 3°13′28″E

The Markt (Dutch for "Market") is the central square of Bruges, West Flanders, Belgium. It is located in the city centre and covers an area of about 1 ha (2.5 acres). On the south side of the square is one of the city's most famous landmarks, the 13th-century Belfry.

== History ==
The square has attracted many people since the 10th century and the first international annual fair was held around 1200. The first hall was built around 1220 as a place to sell merchants' goods. They were small wooden buildings on the south side of the square. Around 1240, a larger building with a wooden tower was built. In 1280, it was destroyed by a fire and rebuilt in stone from 1291 to 1296. It was also decided to build a "Waterhall" over the Reie river nearby, on the east side of the square. The Waterhall was a covered unloading and storage place for boats from Damme. Before the Waterhall was built, the goods were loaded and unloaded in the open air at the Reiekaai on the square.

There has been fish trading on the square since 1396. The fishmongers' craft house was on the north side of the square, close to St. Christopher's Church. In 1709, a kind of iron fish market was built, which moved in 1745 together with the fish market to the Braamberg, where the fish market still is today. The corn market was moved from the Braamberg to the square in the same period. Major events, jousts and tournaments were also held then in the square, as well as executions, which attracted large audiences.

In the period between 1807 and 1810 the square was called the "Place Napoléon", then the "Grote Markt". The renaming to "Markt" took place in 1936. The Markt was completely renovated in 1995–96. Parking spaces on the square were removed and the area became mostly traffic-free, thus being more celebration friendly. The renovated square was reopened in 1996 with a concert by Helmut Lotti.

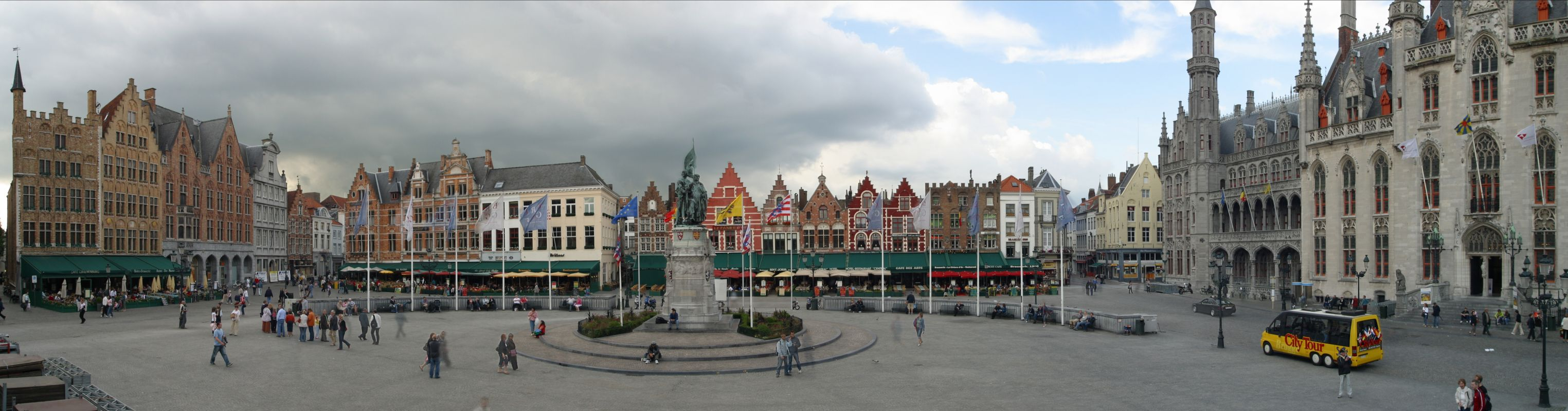
Panoramic view of the Markt

== Structures ==
The Markt contains several historical structures, including the 12th-century Belfry on the south side of the square and the Provincial Court at no. 3. The latter was originally constructed as the Waterhall. In 1787, it was demolished and replaced by a classicist building, which served as the provincial court from 1850. After a fire in 1878, it was rebuilt in a neo-Gothic style nine years later.

No. 16 was historically the site of a mansion, where Archduke Maximilian, heir to the Habsburg Empire was imprisoned in 1488. It has since become a café.

In the centre of the square is a statue of Jan Breydel and Pieter de Coninck, fighters at the Battle of the Golden Spurs in 1302. It was originally unveiled in July 1887 in a local ceremony, followed by a formal opening that August by King Leopold II.

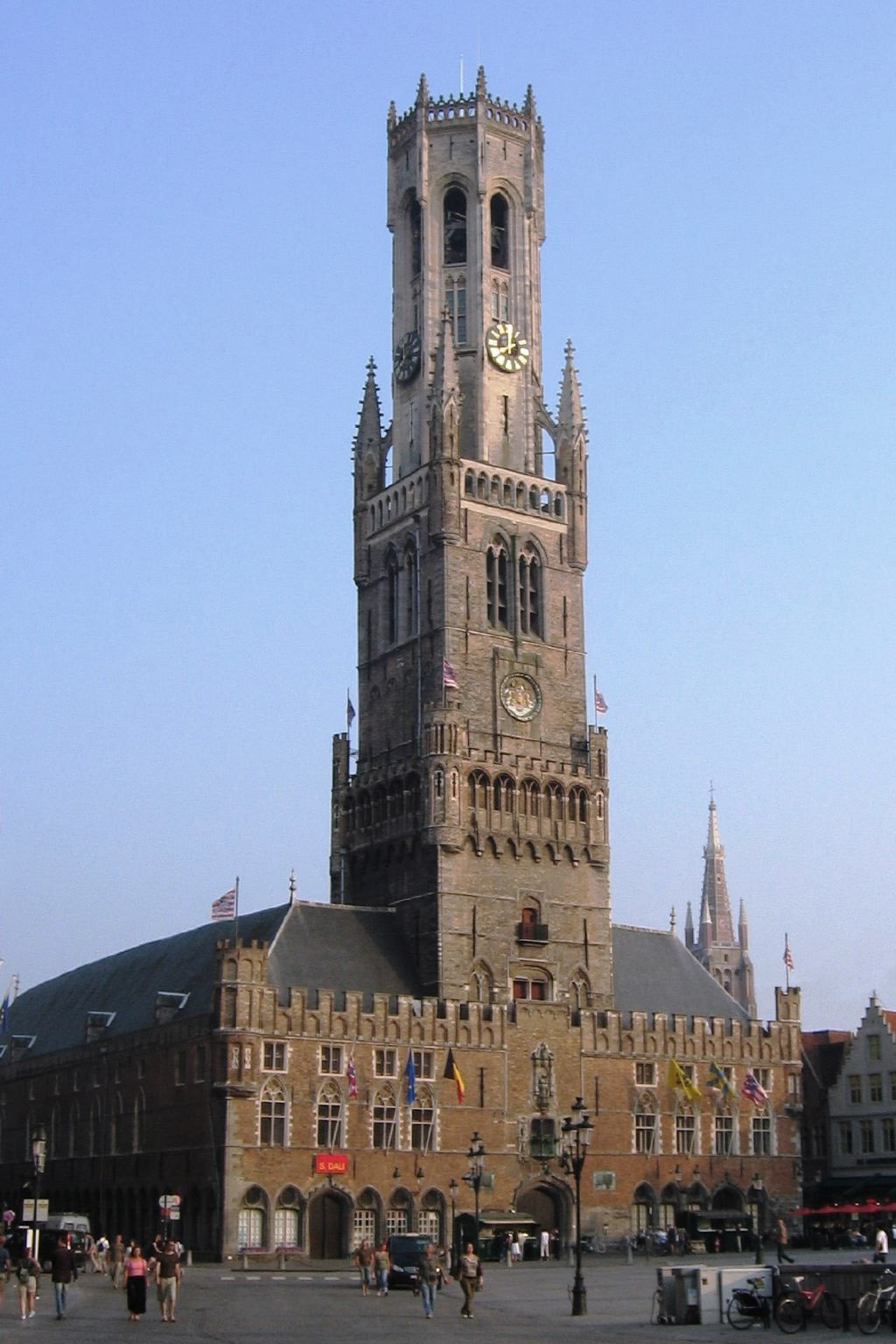
Belfry

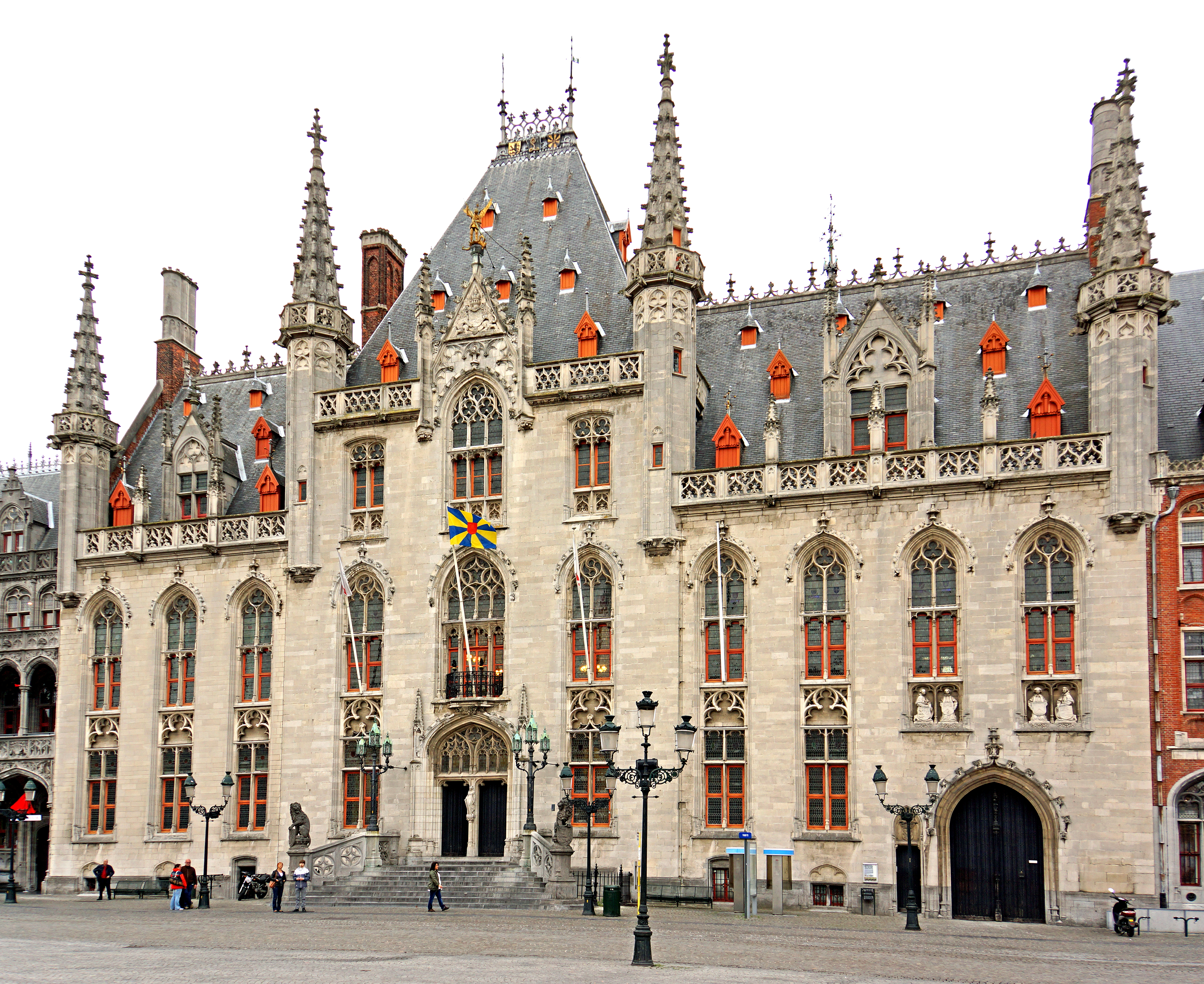
Provinciaal Hof (Provincial Court)

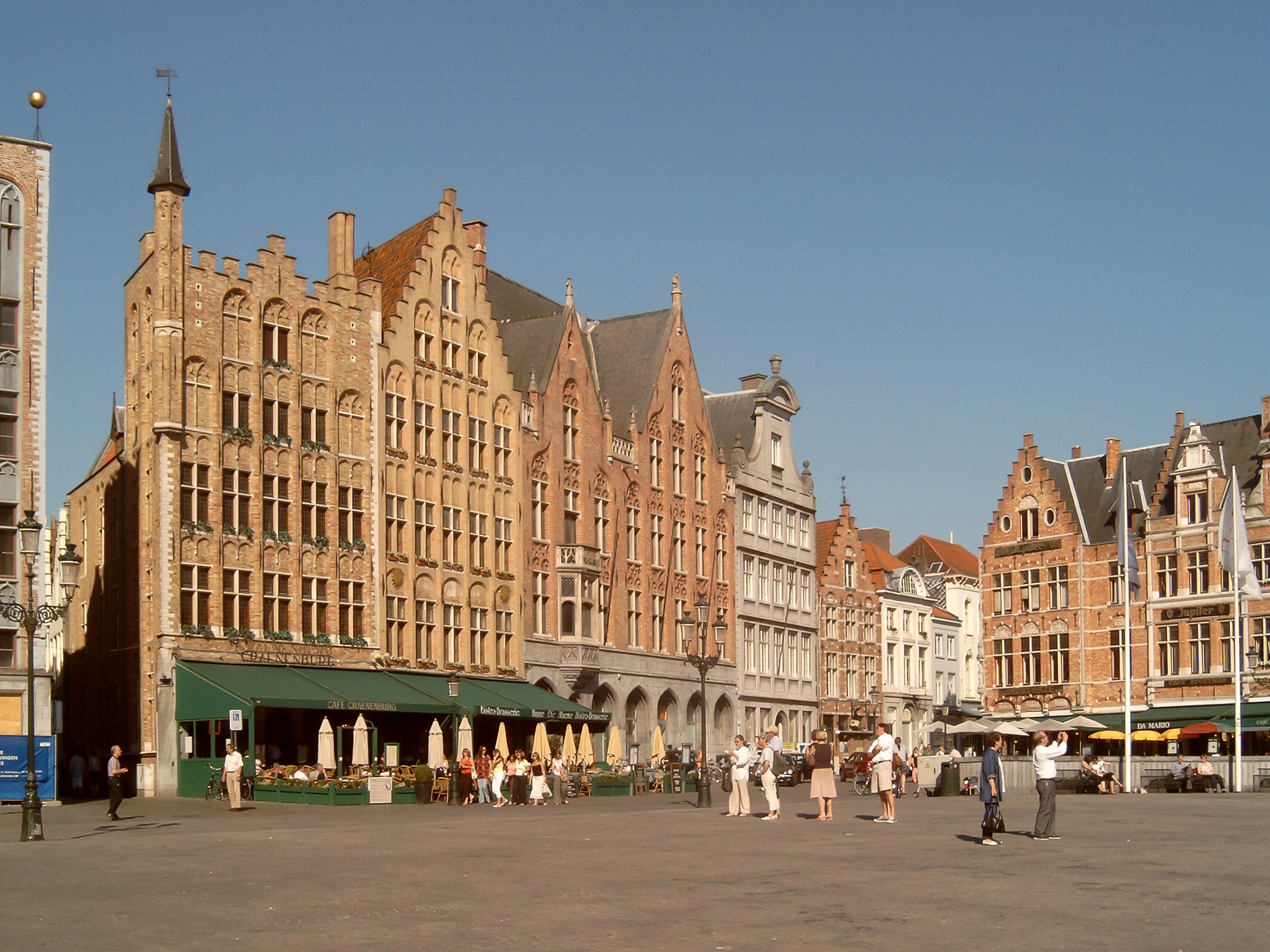
Cranenburg House (left)

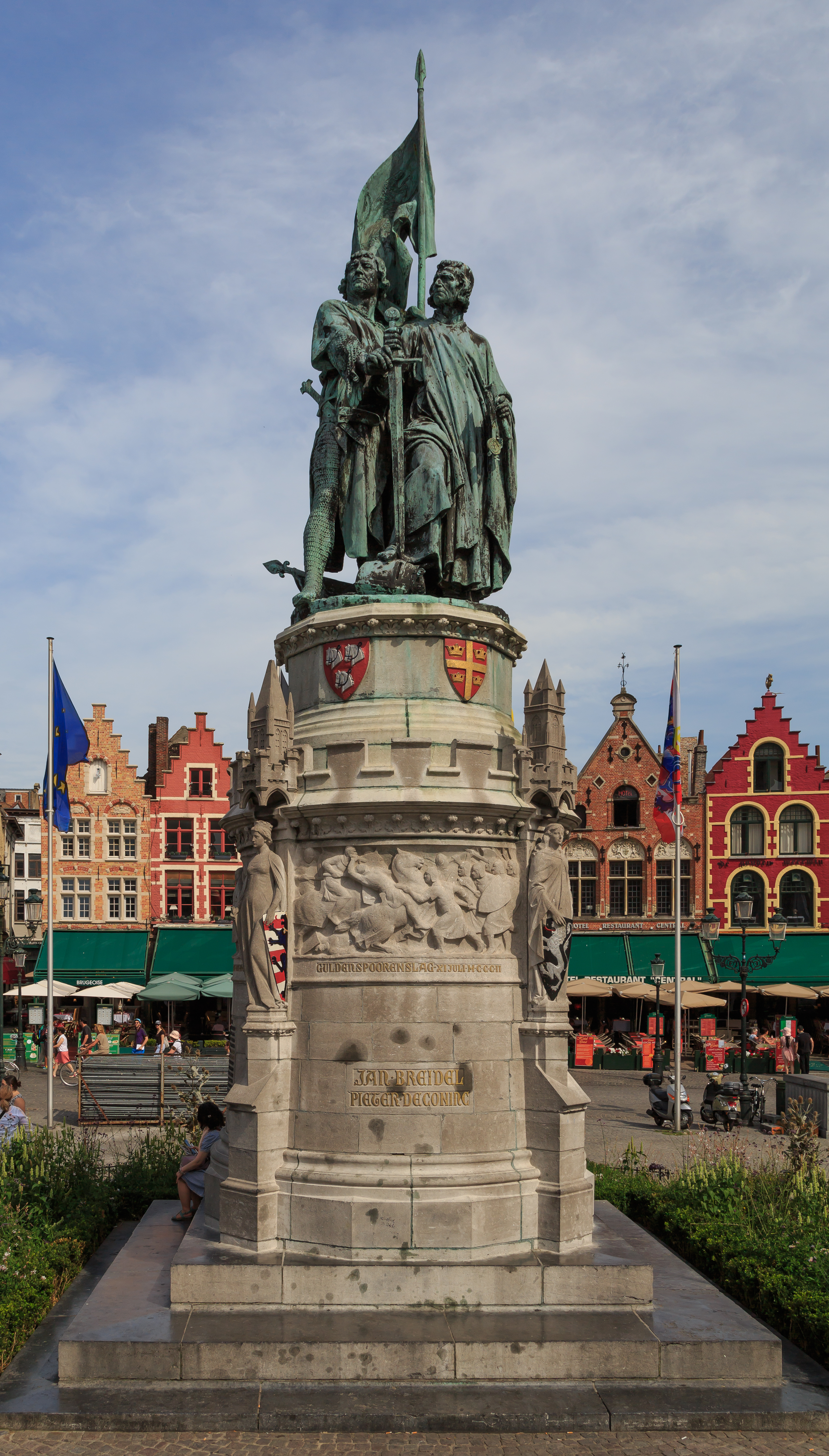
Statue of Jan Breydel and Pieter de Coninck

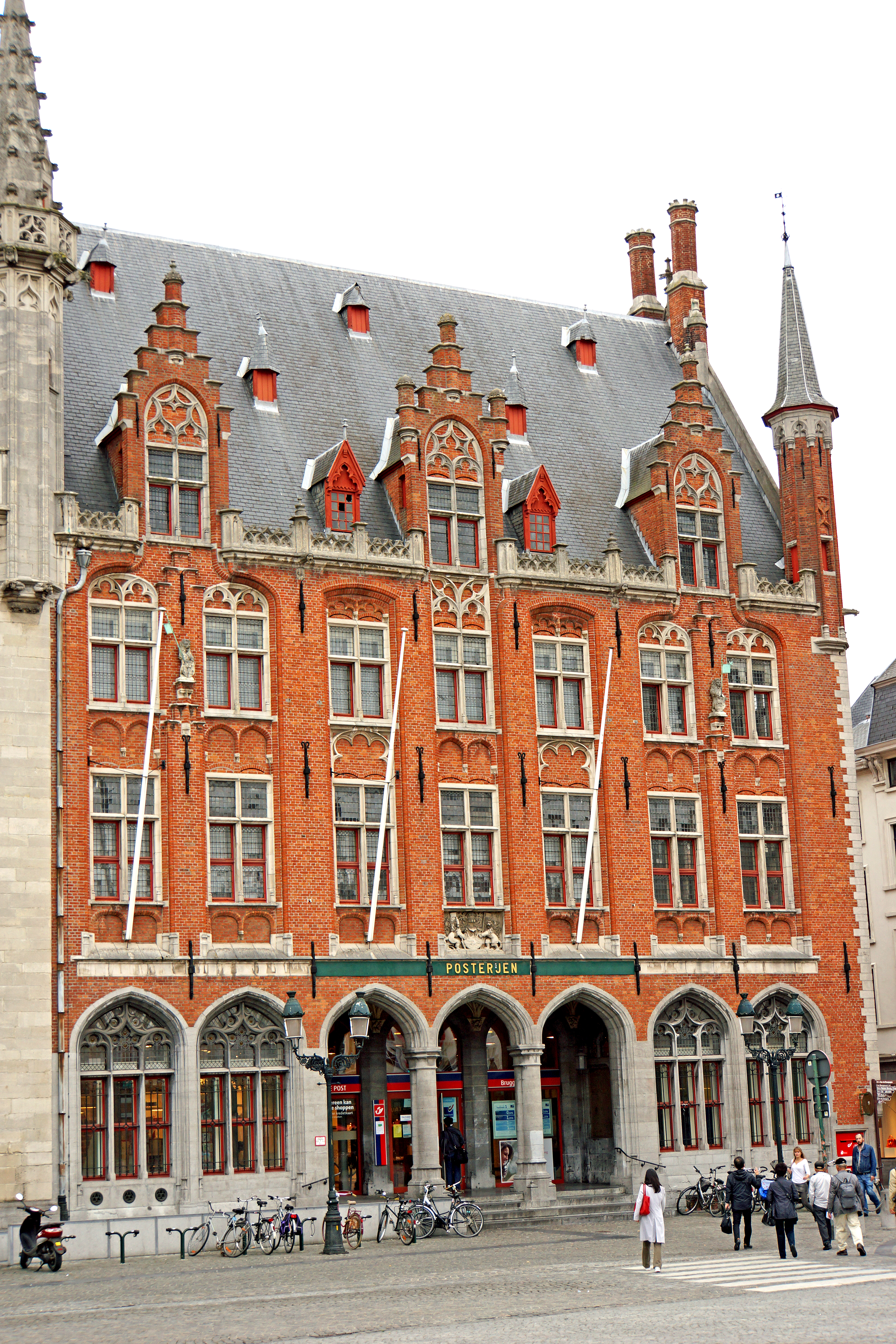
Post building

== See also ==
- History of Belgium
- Belgium in the long nineteenth century
