= Basilica of the Holy Blood =

Roman Catholic basilica

- Dutch: Heilig-Bloedbasiliek
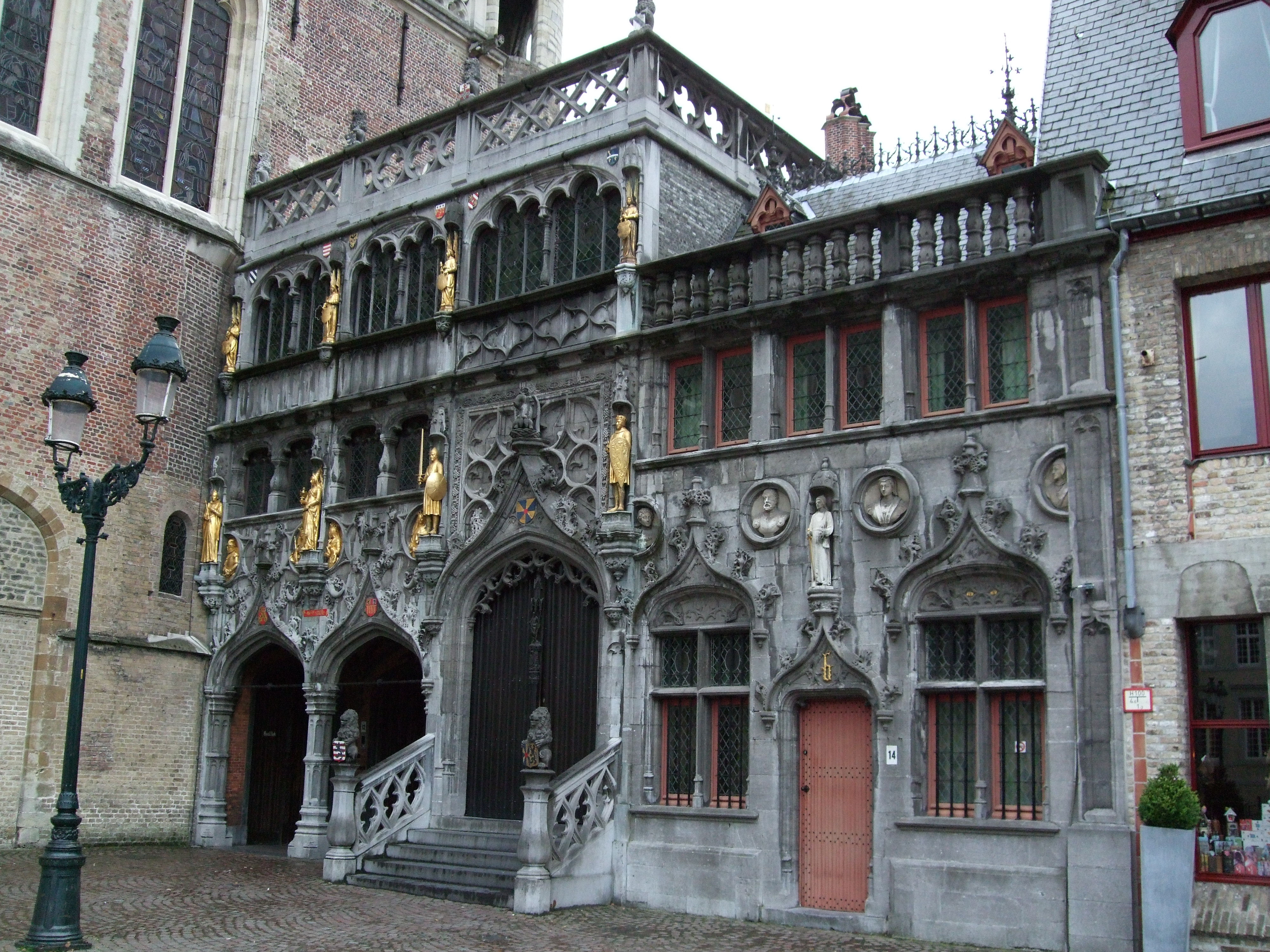

Religion
- Affiliation: Roman Catholic
- Ecclesiastical or organisational status: Minor basilica
- Leadership: Canon Libert Bruneel

Location
- Location: Bruges, Belgium
- Interactive map of Basilica of the Holy Blood
- Coordinates: 51°12′29.4″N 3°13′36.2″E

Architecture
- Type: Church
- Style: Romanesque, Gothic Revival
- Groundbreaking: 1134
- Completed: 1157
- Direction of façade: NE

Website
- Official Website

The Basilica of the Holy Blood (Dutch: Heilig-Bloedbasiliek) is a Roman Catholic basilica in Bruges, Belgium. The church houses a relic of the Holy Blood that was, according to tradition, collected by Joseph of Arimathea and brought from the Holy Land by Thierry of Alsace, Count of Flanders. Built between 1134 and 1157 as the chapel of the Count of Flanders, it was promoted to a minor basilica in 1923.

The basilica in Burg square consists of a lower and upper chapel. The lower chapel, dedicated to St. Basil the Great, is a dark Romanesque structure that remains virtually unchanged. The venerated Passion relic is in the upper chapel, which was rebuilt in the Gothic style in the 16th century and renovated in the 19th century in Gothic Revival style.

== History ==
In 1134, Thierry of Alsace decided to build a private double chapel next to the Oud Steen, the first residence of the Counts of Flanders, transformed today into the town hall of Bruges. Thierry went on crusade a second time in 1147 during the Second Crusade. According to the tradition, Thierry of Alsace returned to his capital Bruges on April 7, 1150, with the relic of the Precious Blood. During the first half of the 13th century, the name of the upper chapel was changed to the Chapel of the Holy Blood.

== Chapel of St. Basil ==
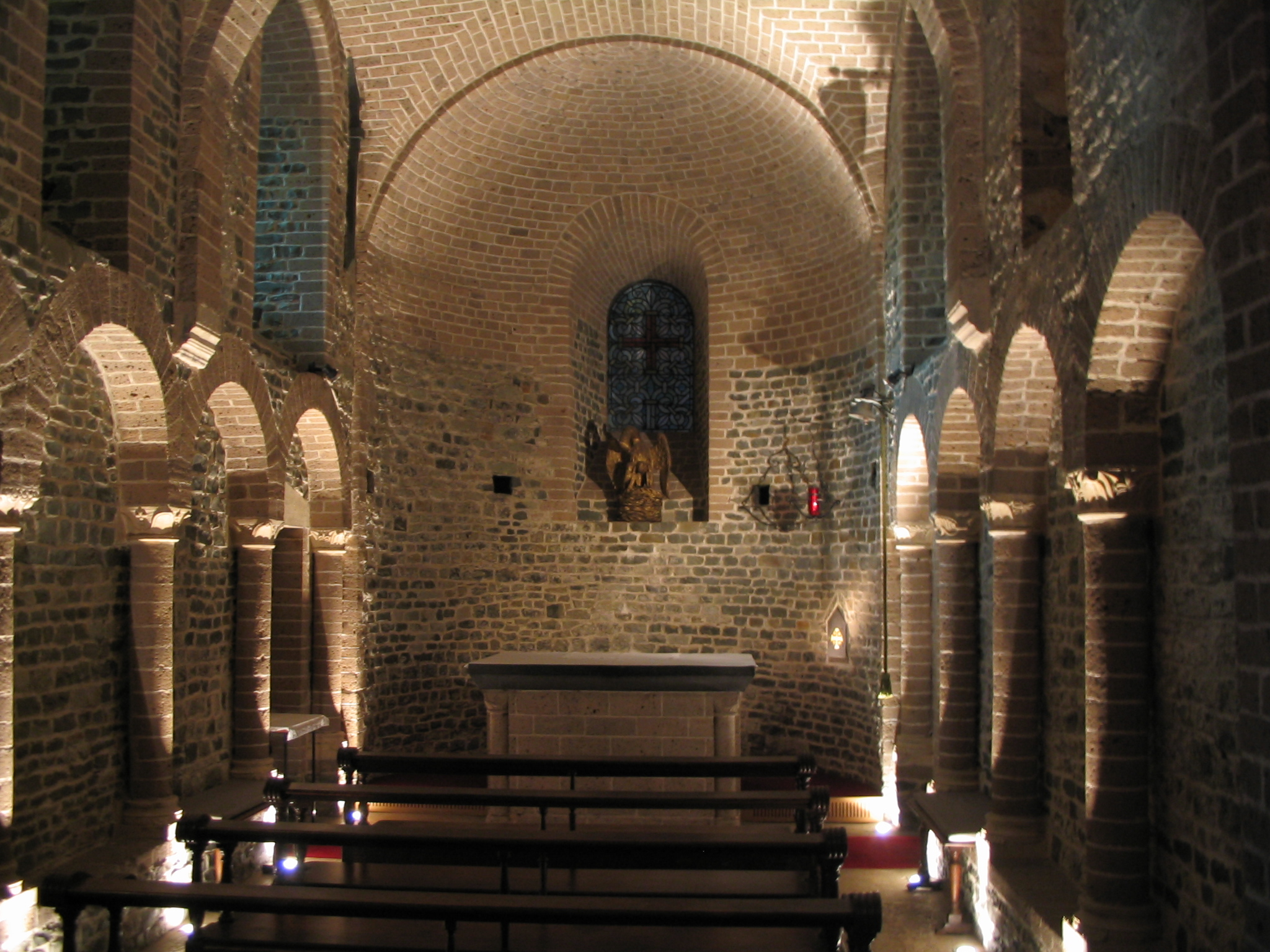
Romanesque Chapel of St. Basil

The Chapel of St. Basil is one of the best preserved churches in Romanesque style of West Flanders. Built from 1134 to 1149, the chapel is dedicated to St. Basil the Great of whom a relic was brought back by Count Robert II from Caesarea Mazaca in Cappadocia, Asia Minor (modern-day Turkey).

The chapel consists of two side naves and a central nave continued by the choir, which in turn is ended by a semi-circular apse. In the tympanum above the entrance linking the chapel and the annex is a 12th-century representation of the baptism of Saint Basil. In the right nave, the seated Madonna and Child (Sedes Sapientiae) is a wooden polychrome sculpture of the early 14th century. Carried each year during the procession, two venerated wooden statues, made around 1900 and representing Jesus on the Cold Stone and the Pieta are displayed.

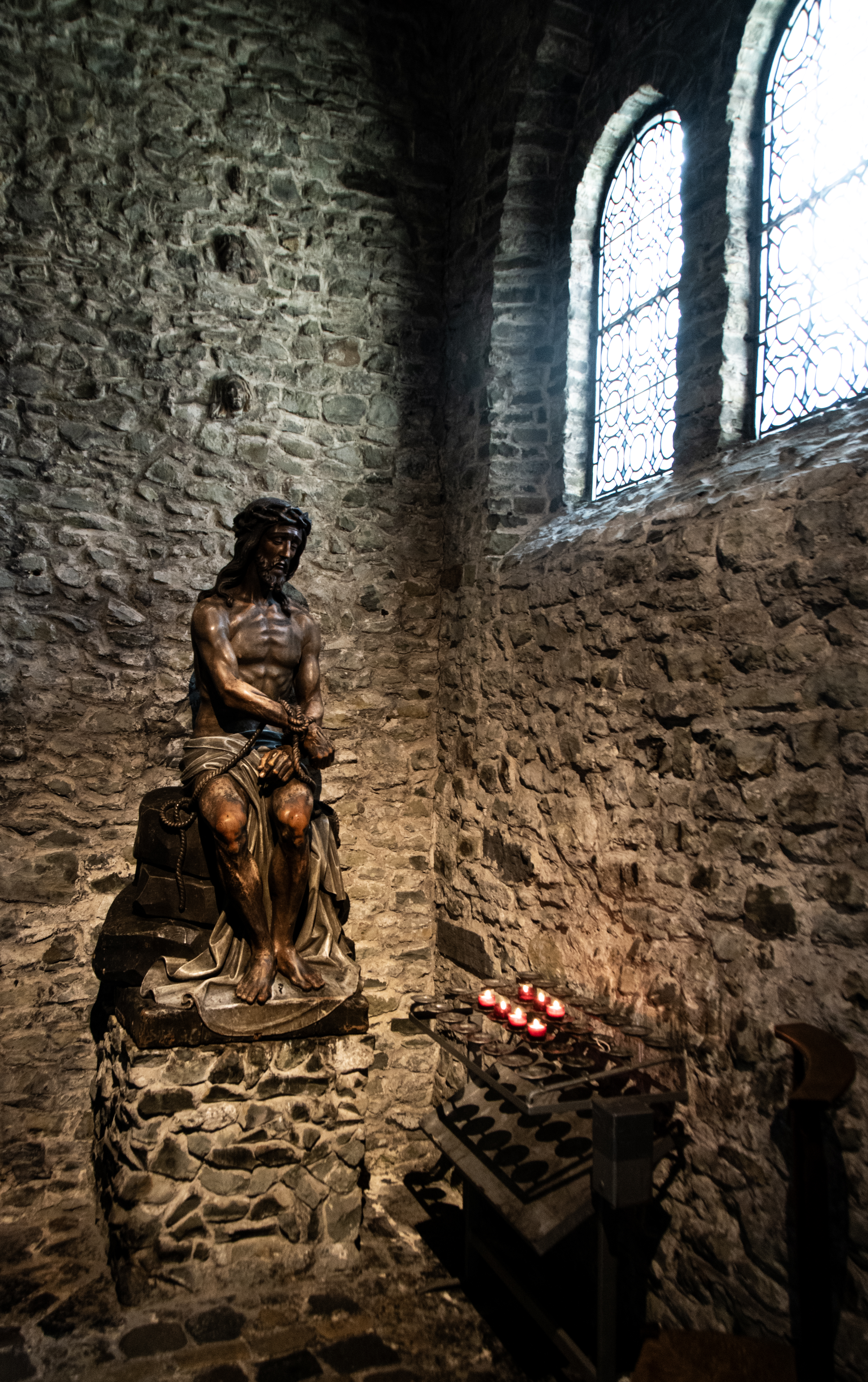
Jesus on the Cold Stone, St. Basil Chapel

At the left of the choir, the chapel of Saint Yves was added in 1504 and houses the relics of Saint Basil and of Blessed Charles the Good, Count of Flanders. The black marble retable is allegedly executed from designs by Lancelot Blondeel.

== Chapel of the Holy Blood ==
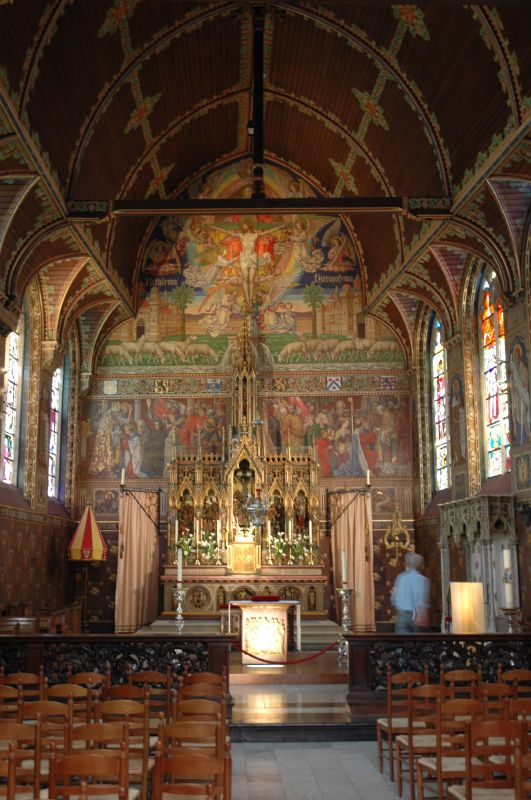
Main altar of the Basilica of the Holy Blood

Originally built in Romanesque style like the St. Basil Chapel, the upper chapel was transformed in Gothic Style at the end of the 15th century and again in 1823. Only the curved arches giving access to the side chapel of the Holy Cross remain from the original Romanesque chapel.

The monumental staircase, commonly named De Steegheere, which leads to the upper chapel, was built in from 1529 to 1533 in late Gothic and Renaissance style according to the drawings of Flemish painter and architect William Aerts, ornamented on the outside with sculpted statues. The aftermath of the French Revolution left the staircase badly damaged and it was decided in 1832 to move it 4 metres (13 ft) backwards and to rebuild it after removing the remaining ruins of the Oud Steen. The gilded bronze statues represent Archduchess Isabelle of Burgundy, Mary of Burgundy, Thierry of Alsace and Philip of Alsace and, in the medallions, the Archdukes of Austria Albert VII and Maximilian III, Margaret of York and Sibylla of Anjou, wife of Thierry and daughter of King Fulk of Jerusalem.

During the 19th century, successive renovation campaigns gave to the chapel its final Gothic Revival aspect, with its characteristic mural decorations. The stained-glass windows in the choir date from 1845 and represent the sovereigns who reigned over the County of Flanders from Philip the Bold, duke of Burgundy, till Archduchess Maria Theresa of Austria, Holy Roman empress.

The following architects and artists took part in these neo-Gothic renovations of the Chapel of the Holy Blood:

- Jean-Baptiste Bethune
- Louis Delacenserie
- Thomas Harper King
- William Curtis Brangwyn, father of Frank Brangwyn
- Charles De Wulf, architect of the city of Bruges and winner of the Prix de Rome in 1887

The pulpit in the form of a globe was made in 1728 by Henry Pulinckx, inspired by its evangelical purpose : "Go into all the world and preach the gospel" Mark 16:15.

The large wall-painting behind the high altar was realized in 1905. In the upper part, the Mystery of the Cross depicts Christ shedding his blood, with, in the background, the towns of Bethlehem, where Christ was born, and Jerusalem where he died. The lower part depicts the transport of the relic from Jerusalem to Bruges: on the left, Thierry of Alsace receives the relic from Baldwin III of Jerusalem, King of Jerusalem; on the right, kneeling besides Countess Sibylla of Anjou, he hands over the relic to the chaplain.

The high altar used today for the Eucharist is decorated with a relief in alabaster from the beginning of the 17th century depicting the Last Supper. Typical attributes of a basilica, the tintinnabulum, the small processional bell, and the Umbraculum, the sunscreen in the form of a parasol in yellow and red silk, are displayed next to the high altar.

Laurent Delvaux completed in 1751 the white marble altar in Baroque style for the relic side chapel. The two adoring angels were made by Peter Pepers. The relic is kept in a magnificent silver tabernacle made by local silversmith François Ryelandt (1709–1774), representing the "Lamb of Christ". To the right of the altar, the painting of Jacob van Oost depicts the descent from the Cross. The relic is shown to the public every Friday and every day two weeks before Ascension Day.

== Relic of the Precious Blood ==
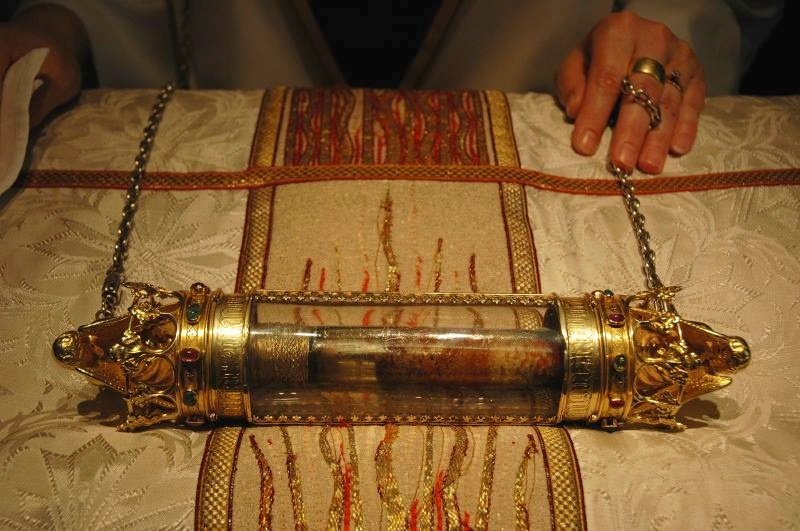
Relic of the Holy Blood

The basilica is best known as the repository of a venerated phial said to contain a cloth with blood of Jesus Christ, brought to the city by Thierry of Alsace after the 12th century Second Crusade. Although the Bible never mentions Christ's blood being preserved, Acts of Pilate—one of the apocryphal gospels—relates that Joseph of Arimathea preserved the Precious Blood after he had washed the dead body of Christ; legends of Joseph were popular in the early thirteenth century, connected also with the emerging mythology of the Holy Grail. Popular legend claims that the phial was taken to Bruges during the Second Crusade of CE 1147–1149, by Thierry of Alsace, who returned from Jerusalem with the relic of the Holy Blood presented to him by his brother-in-law Baldwin III of Jerusalem, as the reward of his great services.

Recent research found no evidence of the presence of the relic in Bruges before the 1250s. In all likelihood, the relic originated from the 1204 sack of Constantinople by the army of the Count of Flanders Baldwin IX, during the Fourth Crusade. Ever since, the phial has played a big part in the religious life of the city. Pope Clement V issued a papal bull in 1310 granting indulgences to pilgrims who visited the chapel to view the relic; the blood was supposed to liquefy weekly at noon on Fridays; the miracle apparently ceased the same year, though a recurrence was alleged in 1388. There is no definitive evidence for or against the authenticity of the relic.

Modern examination has shown that the phial, made of rock crystal and dating back to the 11th or 12th century, was a Byzantine perfume bottle made in the area of Constantinople. Its neck is wound with gold thread and its stopper is sealed with red wax. The phial is encased in a glass-fronted gold cylinder closed at each end by coronets decorated with angels. The date "MCCCLXXXVIII die III maii" (May 3, 1388) is engraved on the frame.

== Procession of the Holy Blood ==
The reliquary used during the procession is displayed in the Basilica Museum. The shrine was made in 1617 in Bruges by goldsmith Jan Crabbe from some 30 kilograms (66 lb) of gold and silver and more than 100 precious stones. It consists of a gem-encrusted hexagonal case topped by golden statues representing Jesus Christ, the Virgin Mary, St. Donatian and St. Basil the Great.

== Jeu du Saint Sang ==
Jeu du Saint Sang is a Belgian passion play, performed in Bruges. It was first published in 1938, and translated into French by Émile Schwartz.

== In popular culture ==
In the 2008 movie In Bruges, Brendan Gleeson as Ken pays a visit to the relic of the Holy Blood. However, the privately owned Church of Jerusalem (Dutch: Jerusalemkerk)—built in the 15th century according to the plans of the Holy Sepulchre in Jerusalem—was used instead of the Basilica.

== Gallery ==
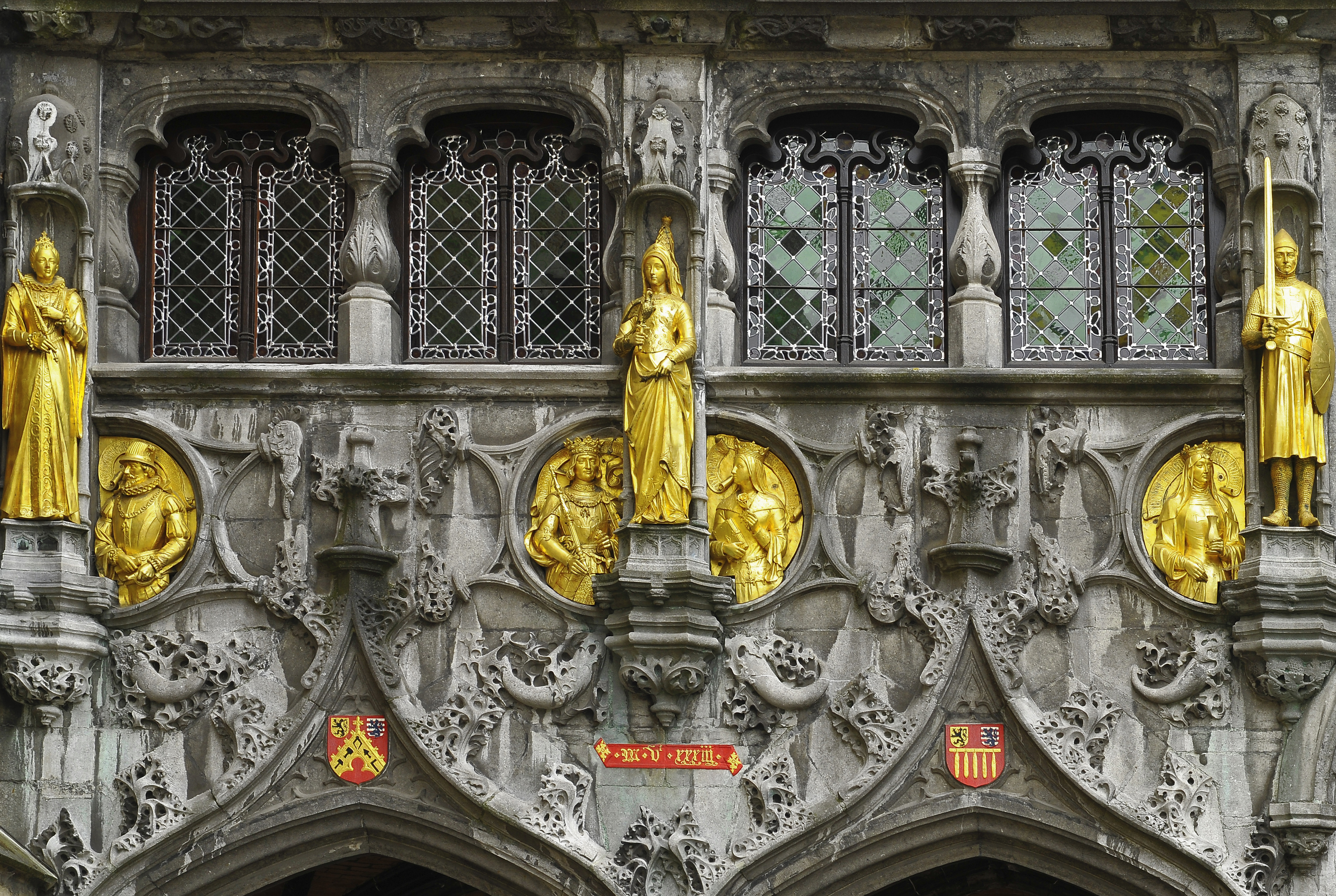
Detail of the entrance of the Basilica

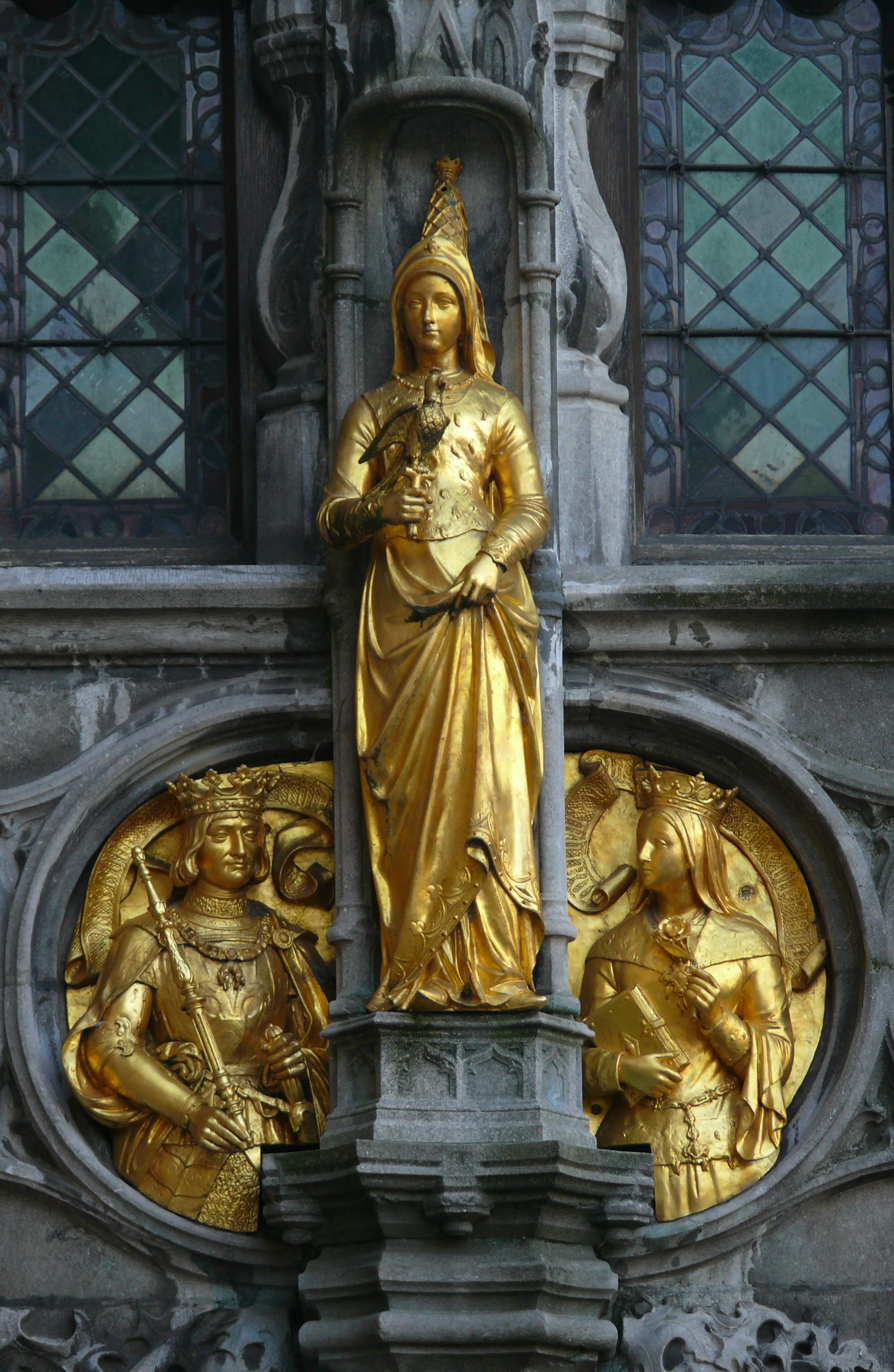
Guilded statue of Mary of Burgundy on the façade

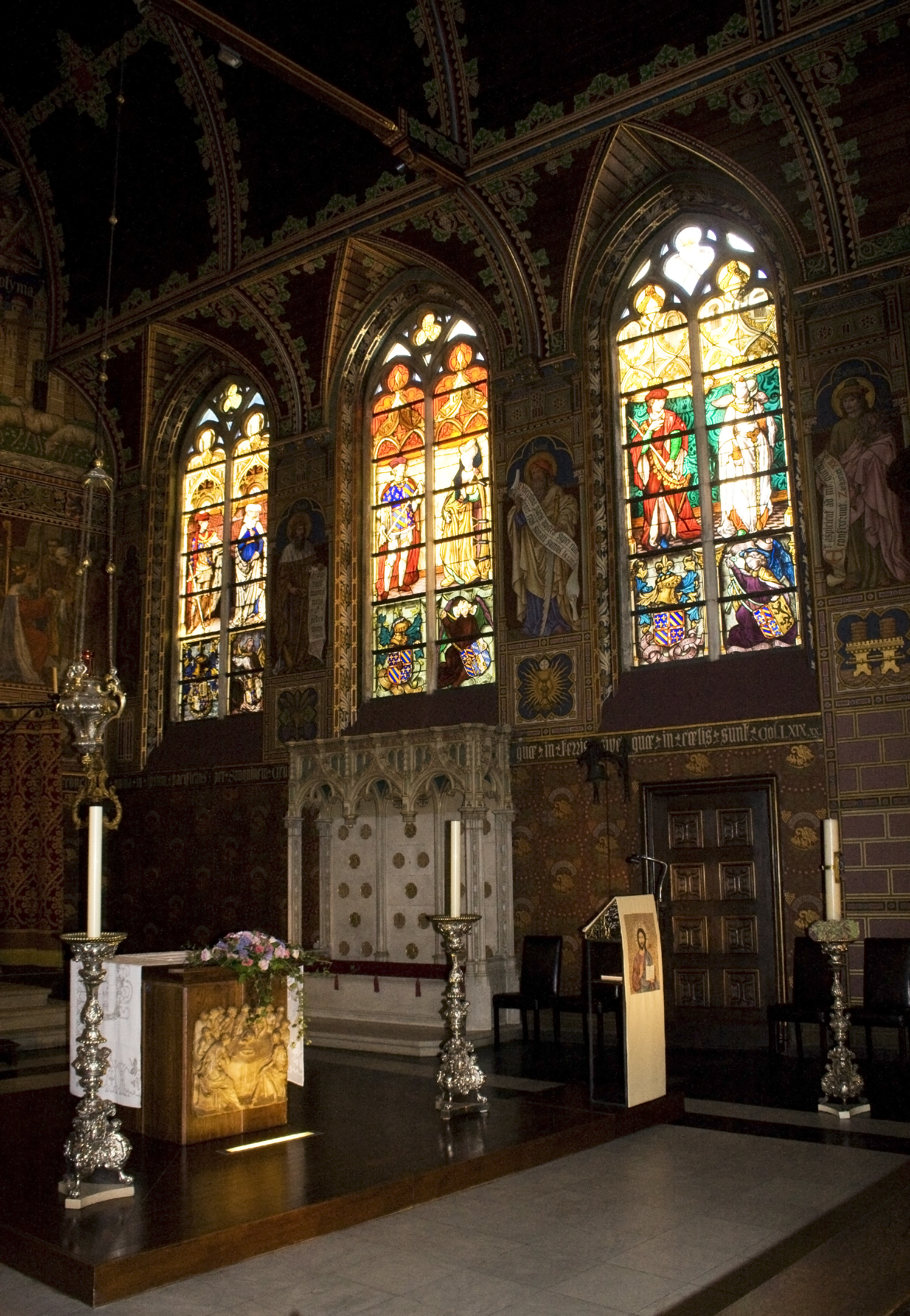
Detail of the main nave with stained glass windows

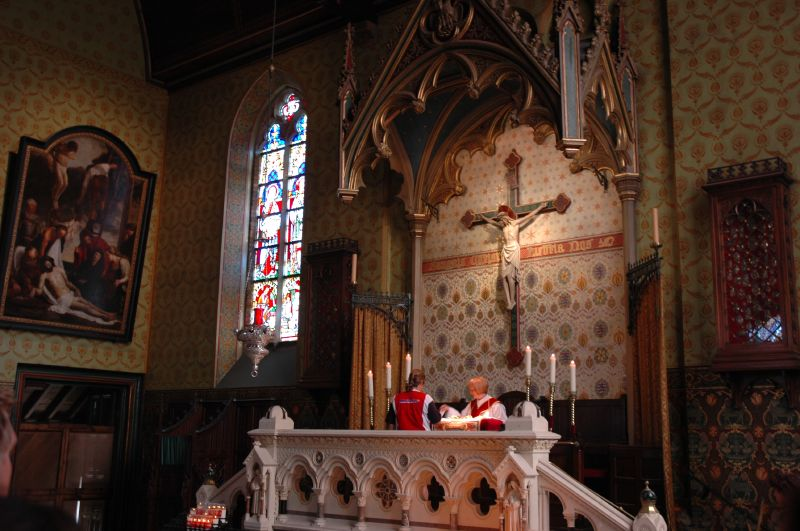
Chapel of the Holy Cross where the relic of the Precious Blood is presented to the worshippers

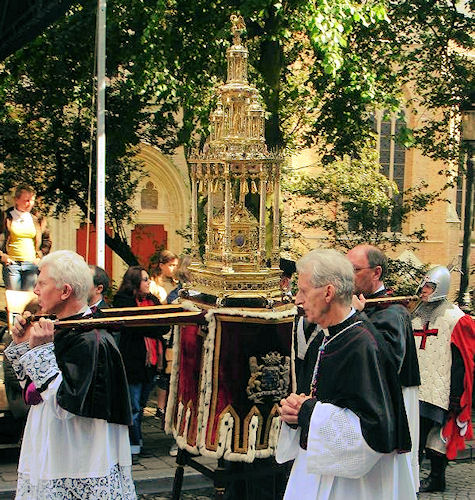
Relic of the Holy Blood, carried during the Procession of the Holy Blood

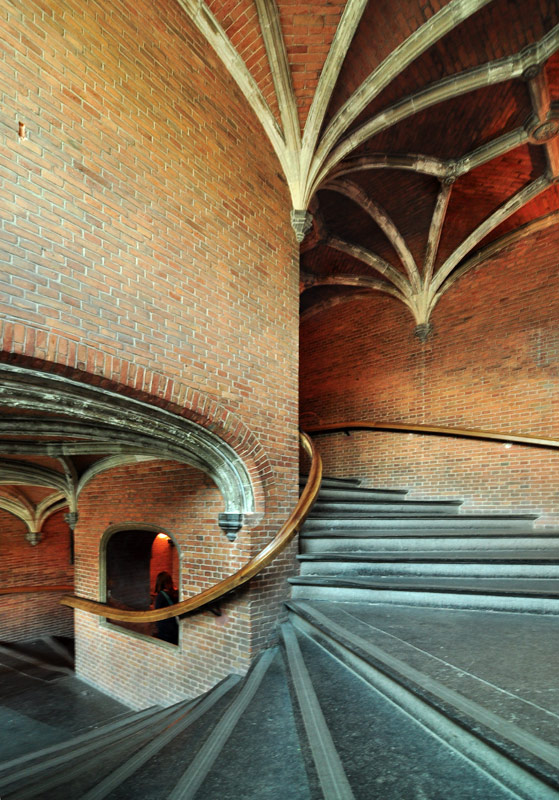
Basilica of the Holy Blood staircase

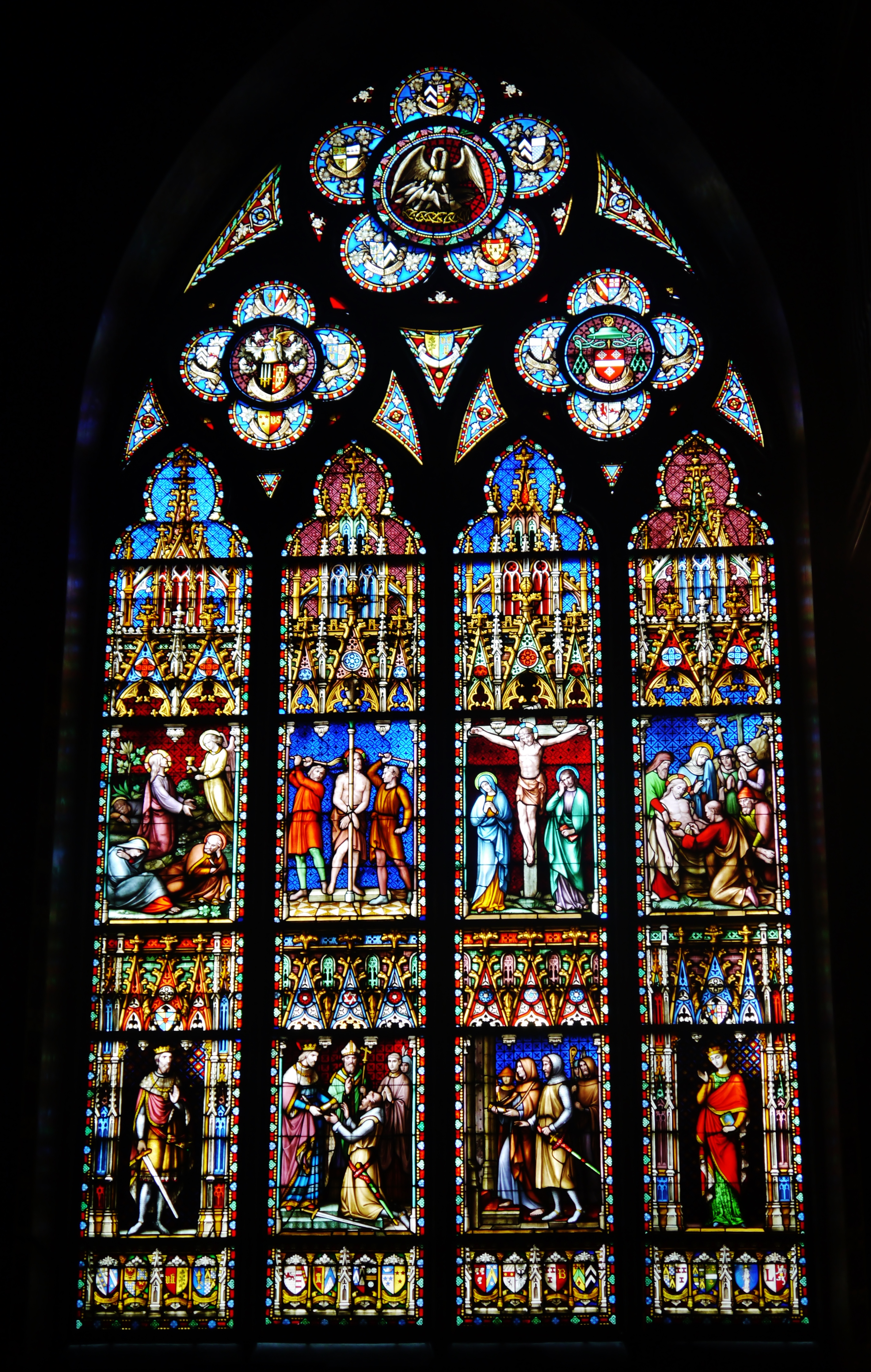
Large stained glass window in the Chapel of the Holy Blood

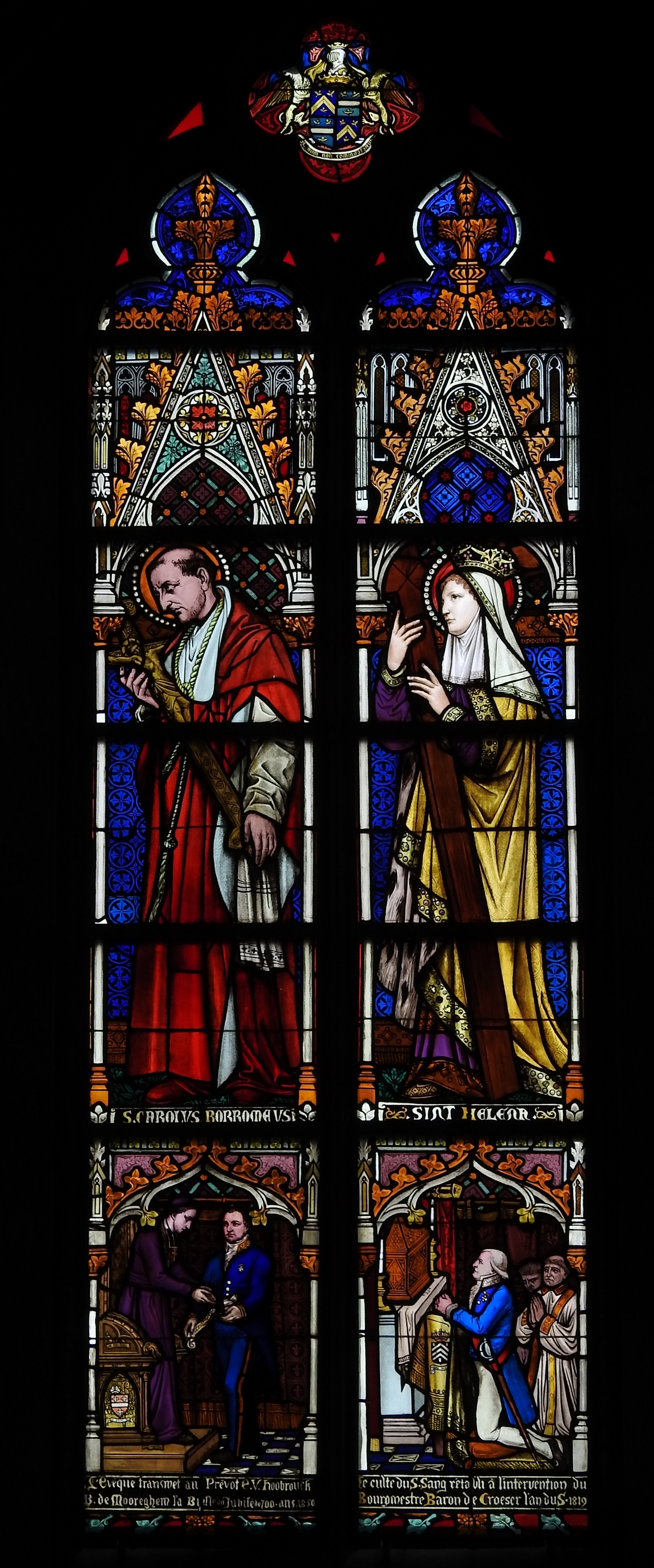
Chapel of the Holy Blood small stained glass window

== See also ==
- Saint Longinus
- Late medieval domes
- Italian Renaissance domes
- List of Catholic churches in Belgium
