= Karel de Visch =

Cistercian bibliographer, and prior of Ten Duinen Abbey

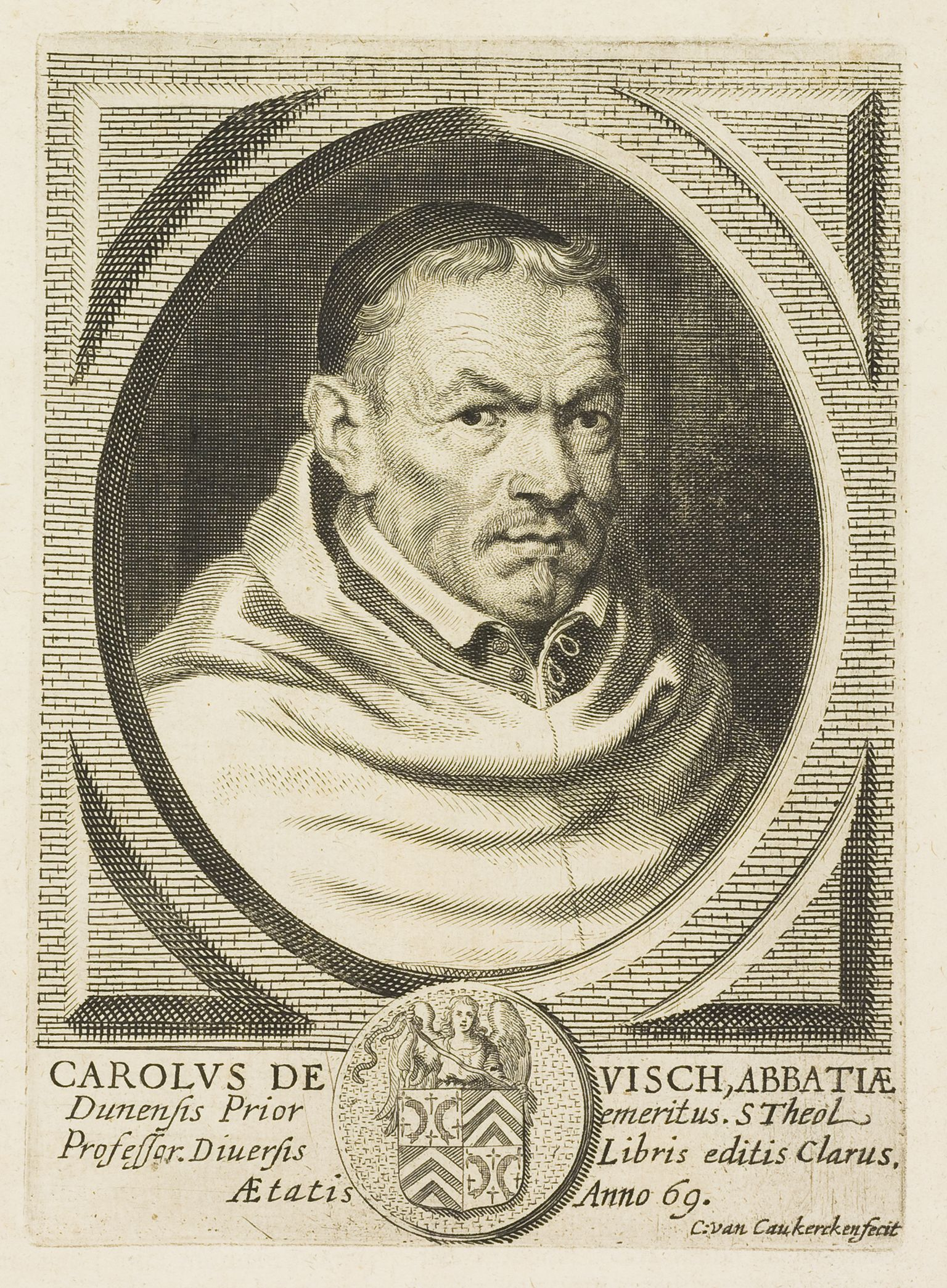
Carolus de Visch at the age of 69

Carolus or Karel de Visch (15 August 1596 – 11 April 1666) was a Cistercian bibliographer, and prior of Ten Duinen Abbey.

== Life ==
De Visch was born in the village of Bulskamp, near Veurne (County of Flanders) on 15 August 1596, to Joris de Visch and Maria van den Hecke. The family belonged to the minor gentry. After studies at the Latin school in Veurne, he studied philosophy at the University of Douai.

In 1618 Visch became a novice of Ten Duinen Abbey. He made his monastic vows on 10 February 1619. From 1620 Visch compiled a new necrology of the abbey, his first historical work, and became familiar with the Spanish Cistercian historian Crisóstomo Henríquez, then residing in the Low Countries. From 1621 Visch returned to Douai to study theology under Francis Sylvius and George Colveneere, graduating Bachelor of Sacred Theology in 1625. Abbot Bernard Campmans appointed him librarian to the abbey, and in 1628 Visch completed a catalogue of the library's manuscripts. In 1644 he produced a revised and updated catalogue.

In 1629 he was sent to Germany, spending time in the abbeys of Altenberg, Eberbach and Altenkamp. From 1630 to 1631 he taught theology at Eberbach, until interrupted by Swedish advances in the Thirty Years War. In 1632, after his return to the Low Countries, he was appointed confessor to the nuns of Groeninge Abbey in Kortrijk. His disagreements with Abbess Catharina Doens about the implementation of the Tridentine reforms of monastic life led to his forced removal from the abbey in 1636. In 1637 he was appointed confessor to Hemelsdaele Abbey, where he remained until 1649, when the new abbot of Ten Duinen, Bernard Bottyn, appointed him prior. At Bottyn's death in 1653, Visch was in the running to succeed him, but in the event the new abbot was to be Gerard de Baere.

As a historian and bibliographer of his community and his order, Visch corresponded with Sanderus, Bollandus, Henschenius, Mabillon, and Ferdinando Ughelli.

Visch retired as prior in 1661, but retained the dignity of prior emeritus. He died in Bruges on 11 April 1666.

== Works ==
- Bibliotheca Scriptorum Sacri Ordinis Cisterciensis (Douai, 1649; second edition Cologne, Joannes Busaeus, 1656) – a bibliography of Cistercian authors
- Alani magni de Insulis, Doctoris Universalis, Opera Moralia, Paraenetica et Polemica (Antwerp, Willem Lesteens and Engelbert Gymnicus, 1654) – an edition of works by Alan of Lille
- Vita Reverendi in Christo Patris ac Domini, D. Adriani Cancellier, monasterii Dunensis, Ordinis Cisterciensis, quondam Abbatis (Bruges, Nicolaes Breyghel, 1655) – a biography of Adrianus Cancellier, Abbot of Ten Duinen 1610–1623
- Compendium chronologicum exordii et progressus Abbatiae clarissimae Beatae Mariae de Dunis (Brussels, Philip Vleugaert, 1660) – a chronological compendium of the Abbots of Ten Duinen
