= Bruges Public Library =

Belgian public library

Coordinates: 51.2099°N 3.2228°E

The Bruges Public Library is a public library in Bruges, Belgium.

Since its foundation in 1796 the Public Library of Bruges has functioned both as a public library and a special collections library. The core of the special collections consists of ca. 600 medieval manuscripts, ca. 70 incunables, and the library and archives of the poet Guido Gezelle (1830-1899). The largest portion of medieval manuscripts are the ca. 490 manuscripts from the Cistercian abbeys of Ten Duinen (°1138) and Ter Doest (°1175), which include a large set of illuminated manuscripts produced in Flanders. Another important part of the collection are the ca. 70 illuminated books of hours from, among others, Flanders, the Netherlands and France. The incunable collection includes woodcuts and engravings, e.g. in Colard Mansion's Metamorphoses and Hartmann Schedel's Liber chronicarum. The special collections include works by artists like Willem Vrelant, the Master of Guillebert de Metz, the Master of the Tall Figures (Beaufort Group), Hieronymus and Antonius Wierix, and Michael Wolgemut. Most of the books from the special collection are digitalised and can be consulted online through the library's catalogue.

== History ==
The public library of Bruges manages one of the most important collections of manuscripts, incunables and historical journals in Flanders. In 2011 the library received the licence of recognized heritage library by the Flemish Community. The core of the collection stems from library of the former Cistercian abbeys of Ten Duinen (°Koksijde, 1128) and Ter Doest (°Lissewege, 1175). In 1804 the city of Bruges was entrusted with the conservation and management of the collection of both abbeys after they were confiscated by French revolutionaries under the authority of Napoleon. The extensive collection was moved to the Gothic Hall of the City Hall. The library was later relocated to the Jan Van Eyck square in 1883 due to a lack of space in the City Hall. In 1986 the library was moved to the Kuiperstraat, where it still is to this day.

== Public Library ==
The public library of Bruges has twelve branches spread across the city and its neighbourhoods, with Biekorf being the main library. The different branches are located in:

- Bruges
- Zeebrugge
- Lissewege
- Dudzele
- Koolkerke
- Sint-Jozef
- Sint-Pieters
- Sint-Kruis
- Assebroek
- Sint-Andries
- Sint-Michiels

According to the annual report from 2019, the main library and its branches lent nearly one million books to its more than 500,000 visitors. The library also organises lectures and workshops for different age groups.

== Special Collections Library ==
The core of the special collections consists of ca. 600 medieval manuscripts, ca. 70 incunables, and the library and archives of the poet Guido Gezelle (1830-1899). The Bruges Public Library preserves 798 manuscripts in total, of which 576 are medieval and 222 are post-medieval. The largest portion of medieval manuscripts are the ca. 490 manuscripts from the Cistercian abbeys of Ten Duinen (°1138) and Ter Doest (°1175). Another important subcollection are the ca. 70 illuminated Books of Hours from, among others, Flanders, the Netherlands and France, and medieval copies of urban chronicles, e.g. the Excellente kroniek van Vlaanderen. Not all manuscripts are property of the Bruges Public Library, 31 manuscripts of the Stichting van Caloen and one manuscript of the King Baudouin Foundation are in long-term deposit at the library. The Bruges Public Library does not only preserve the manuscripts, it also participates in Mmmonk and ARMA, two projects with the aim to digitalise the manuscripts so that they are accessible to a larger public. These manuscripts are not the only old texts preserved in the library, there also is a collection of incunabula and rare books. The focus is on old prints, which originate from Bruges. The eye-catchers in this collection are the incunabula from the Flemish printer Colard Mansion (1476-1484). To this day, the Bruges Public Library is still acquiring old prints, in order to achieve the ultimate goal: collecting the entire Bruges book production and offering it to the public.

Another important collection is the Guido Gezelle Archives and Library. The Gezelle Archive contains some 10,000 items including more than 2000 poetry manuscripts from his own hand. The other items are mostly letters; Gezelle's letter collection is very extensive and the library has about 7600 letters. In addition to his own manuscripts and his letters, the Gezelle Library preserves some 1000 books from Gezelle's private library. This contains mostly linguistic, religious and didactic books, as well as books on Germanic and alien folklore. A large part of this collection has already been digitalised, and is accessible from home.

The Bruges Public Library also has a large collection of historical newspapers. The oldest preserved newspaper is the Nieuwe Tijdinghen, which appeared from 1637 until 1645 and was printed in Bruges by Nicolas Breyghel. The next newspaper was the Vaderlandsch Nieuwsblad (1792-1793), followed by the Brugsche Gazette (1795-1796) and the Gazette van Brugge (1797-1919). Bruges had a very rich press in the 19th and the first half of the 20th century. Besides many single issues, the collection of the Public Library contains 64 titles and more than half a million pages, most of which can be consulted online.

In addition to these main collections, ten smaller collections, originally private collections of Bruges citizens, were transferred to the Bruges Public Library in the course of the 20th century. These are the Fonds Cuvelier, the Fonds voor Maritieme Geschiedenis en Visserij, the Fonds Decoene, the Fonds de Giey, the Fonds De Zeine, the Fonds Dochy, the Fonds Engels klooster, the Fonds English, the Fonds Kring Zeevaart en Overzeese belangen and the Fonds Mertens.
