= Jan Sindewint =

Jan Sindewint, Latinized Joannes de Dunis (died 1319) was a monk of the Cistercian Abbey of Dunes in the County of Flanders, and from 1311 a professor of theology at the Collège Saint-Bernard in the University of Paris. In 1311 he acquired the use of the books of the recently deceased Jan van He, a monk of Ter Doest Abbey who had taught theology at the Collège de Sorbonne from 1303 to 1306.
