= Jan van He =

Jan van He, Latinized Johannes de Capella (died before April 1311) was a monk of the Cistercian Ter Doest Abbey, in the County of Flanders, who graduated Bachelor of Sacred Theology from the Collège de Sorbonne in the University of Paris in 1303, and taught theology in the college from 1303 to 1306. In 1286 his mother, Margriet, had given him the house she was living in to pay for the books he would need for his studies. In 1311 the use of his books passed to Jan Sindewint, a monk of the Abbey of Dunes.
