= Johann Veldener =

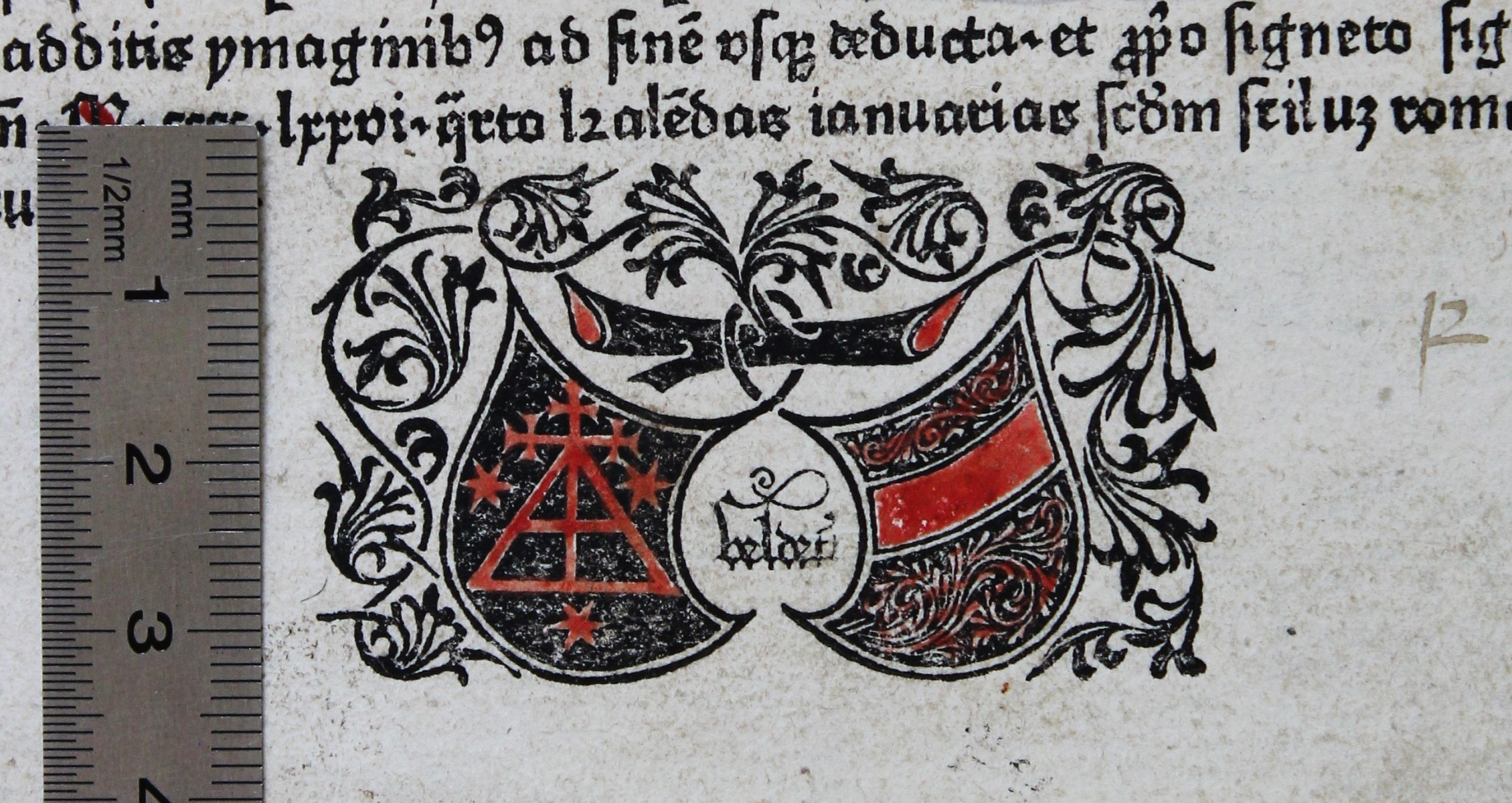
Printer's device of Johann Veldenaer, as used in Werner Rolevinck's Fasciculus temporum (1475). Found in KUL-BC Inc.129 (f. [h]8 recto), Academic libraries in Leuven.

Johann Veldener (born in Würzburg, died in Leuven between 1486 and 1496), also known as Jan Veldener or Johan Veldenaer; was an early printer in Flanders. He worked as a punchcutter and printer in Cologne, together with William Caxton, who may have financed his first books. They both left for Flanders in 1472. Evidence indicates that Veldener assisted Caxton in setting up his printing office in Bruges and helped printing his first work there, the 1472-1473 Recuyell of the Historyes of Troye by Raoul Lefèvre. Afterwards, Veldener went to Leuven and set up his printing company there, becoming the second printer in Leuven after John of Westphalia, and the third or fourth in the Netherlands. He entered the Leuven University on 30 July 1473 in the faculty of Medicine.

He left Leuven in 1477, after the death of Charles the Bold caused unrest in the city, and went to Utrecht. When that city also became troubled, he left for Culemborg, and finally returned to Leuven in 1484.

Veldener was also known for creating typefaces, both for his own work and for others, and Caxton is believed to have taken one of Veldener's typefaces with him to England and used it among others on his first edition of the Canterbury Tales. It is probable that he later bought a number of other typefaces from Veldener as well.

While in Utrecht, Veldener also supposedly wrote a Chronyck van Hollandt, Zeelandt, ende Westvrieslandt (a Chronicle of Holland, Sealand, and Western Friesland), which was reprinted in 1650 in Utrecht. Other works attributed to him are the Cronijcken van Enghelant (a chronicle of the English kings until 1460), Cronijcken van Utrecht (a history of the Bishopric of Utrecht), Cronijcken van Gelre, Cronijcken van Cleve and the Cronijcken van Brabant. Currently it is believed that these works were anonymous and printed by him, and that the later attributions to him as writer are erroneous.

== Works printed by Veldener ==
=== In Cologne (1471-1472) ===
- Walter Burley, De vita philosophorum
- Pope Pius II, De duobus amantibus
- Gesta Romanorum
- Flores Sancti Augustini
- Bartholomeus Anglicus, De proprietatibus rerum

=== In Leuven (1473-1477) ===
==== 1473 ====
- Giovanni Boccaccio, Genealogia deorum

==== 1474 ====
- Jacobus de Theramo, Consolatio peccatorum From the Rare Book and Special Collections Division at the Library of Congress
- Pietro de' Crescenzi, Liber ruralium commodorum

==== 1475 ====
- Angelus de Gambiglionibus de Aretio, also known as Angeli Aretini or Angelo Gambiglioni, Lectura super institutionibus
- Werner Rolevinck, Fasciculus temporum (the second illustrated book to be printed in the Low Countries)
- Lucan, Pharsalia
- Laurentius Valla, Elegantiae linguae latinae

==== 1476 ====
- An almanach, considered to be the oldest known printed almanach in the Netherlands
- Carolus Maneken, Formulae epistolarum (first impression of this book)
- Pope Pius II, Epistolae familiares et in cardinalatu editae and Legatio Friderici III ad summum Pontificem super declaratione concordiae

==== 1477 ====
- Cicero, Epistolae ad familiares
- Raimundus Peraudi, Avisamenta confessorum
- Thomas Aquinas, De beatitudine aeternitatis

=== In Utrecht (1478-1481) ===
==== 1478 ====
- Epistolae et Evangelia or Alle die Epistolen en Ewangelien, metten Sermoenen van den gheheelen jare (reprinted 1479 and 1481)

==== 1479 ====
- Pope Gregory I, Homiliae super Evangeliis / Omelie in duutschen

==== 1480 ====
- Werner Rolevinck, Boeck datmen hiet Fasciculus temporum, reedited with some additional chronicles (attributed sometimes to Veldener); this is the first translation of this book (first published in Latin in 1474, Latin version printed by Veldener in 1475)
- Jacobus de Voragine, Dat passionael ofte gulden legende mit das martirologium
- Lucas de Tollentis, Litterae indulgentiarum anni jubilaei causa 1480

=== In Culemborg (1483-1484) ===
==== 1483 ====
- Spieghel der menschlicker behoudenisse
- Boec van den Houte
- Spinroc

==== 1484 ====
- Kruidboeck in Dietsche (possibly printed in Leuven)

=== In Leuven again (1484-1487?) ===
- Alphabetum divini amoris (two editions)
- Vocabularius (in French and Dutch and Latin)

==== 1484 ====
- Pope Innocent VIII, Regulae cancellariae apostolicae, Lectae 23 Sept. 1484
- Michael Scotus, Liber physiognomiae
- Franciscus de Zabarellis, Repetitio super capitulo Perpendimus de sententia excommunicationis

==== 1485 ====
- Herbarius in Latino (reprinted with illustrations in 1486)

==== 1486 ====
- Matheolus Perusinus, De memoria augenda
- Paulus de Middelburgo, Prognosticon (in Dutch)
- Cornelius Roelans de Mechlinia, Opusculum aegritudinum puerorum

==== 1487 ====
- Valuacie van den gelde
