= Willem van Saeftinghe =

Belgian lay brother

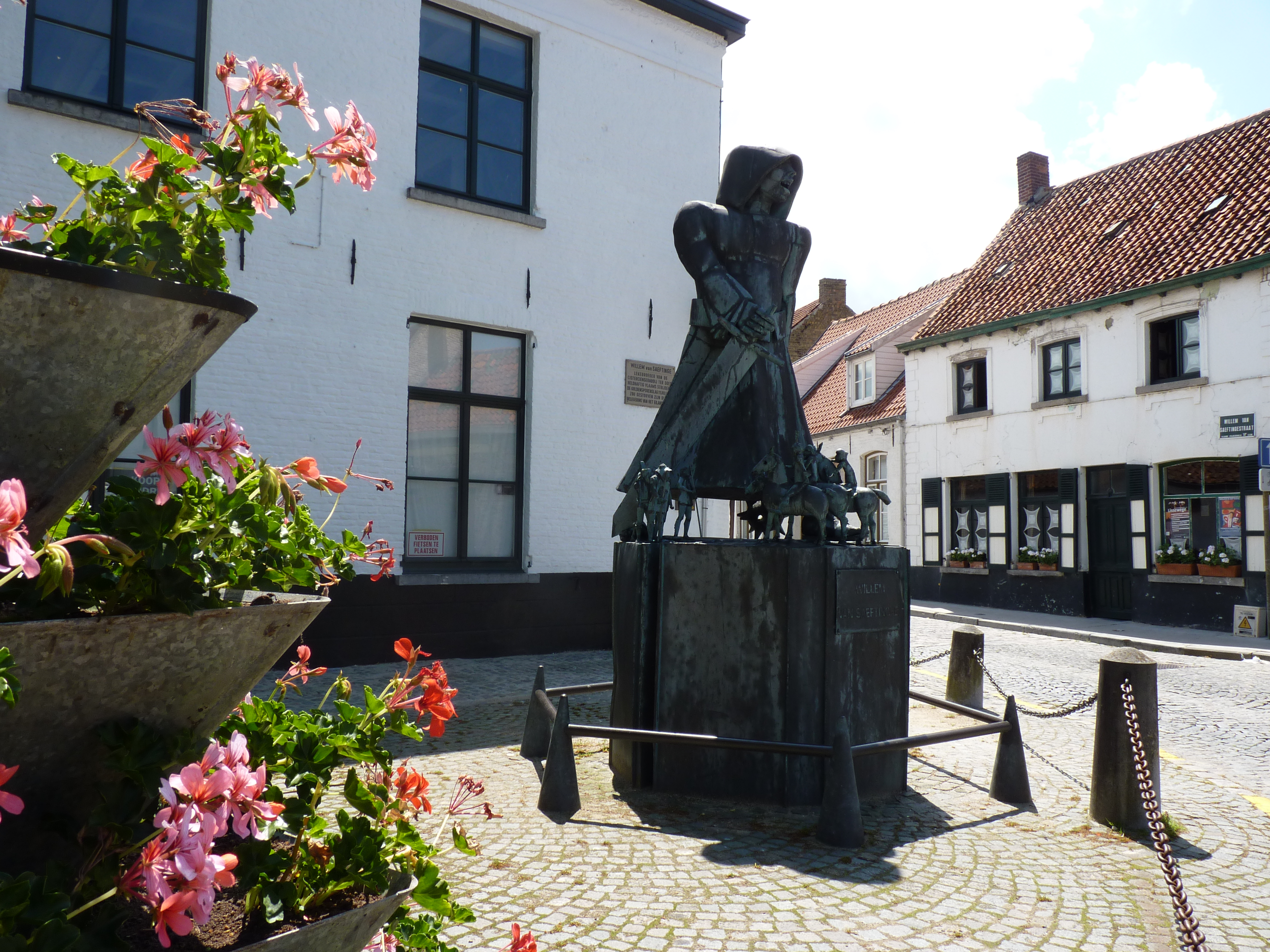
Statue of Willem van Saeftinghe in Lissewege by Jef Claerhout

Willem van Saeftinghe ("William of Saeftinghe"; d. 1309?) was a lay brother in the Cistercian abbey of Ter Doest in Lissewege, West Flanders, Belgium. He fought at the Battle of the Golden Spurs, and became a Flemish folk hero.

== Life ==
19th century portrait of van Saeftinghe by artist Albrecht De Vriendt

Willem was a lay brother in the Cistercian abbey of Ter Doest in Lissewege. During the Battle of the Golden Spurs in 1302 he unhorsed the French leader, Count Robert of Artois, who was then killed by other Flemish fighters. This episode in the battle was represented in a painting by Nicaise de Keyser, displayed in Kortrijk, which was destroyed in the bombing of 21 July 1944, when around 300 Avro Lancasters dropped over 5,000 bombs on the city center. A preliminary study can still be seen in the Stedelijk Museum in Kortrijk. During the battle, he killed many French knights. Contemporary chroniclers stress that he was a very large and extraordinarily strong man. He rode to the battlefield and then exchanged his mount for a goedendag and a spear or sword.

During a revolt of the lay brothers of Ter Doest Abbey in November 1308, he killed the elderly cellarer and severely injured the abbot, Willem van Cordewaeghen. Willem van Saeftinghe sought sanctuary in the church of Lissewege. When the news reached Bruges, Jan Breydel and a son of Pieter de Coninck with 80 inhabitants of the city marched to free him, and carried him back in triumph to Bruges, to the great displeasure of the count, the burghers and the nobility of Flanders.

The judicial vicar of Tournai excommunicated him. Pope Clement V forgave him his misdeeds on 19 November 1309 and granted him absolution but bound him to join the Knights Hospitaller. He was sent on crusade and is believed to have been killed during the conquest of Rhodes.

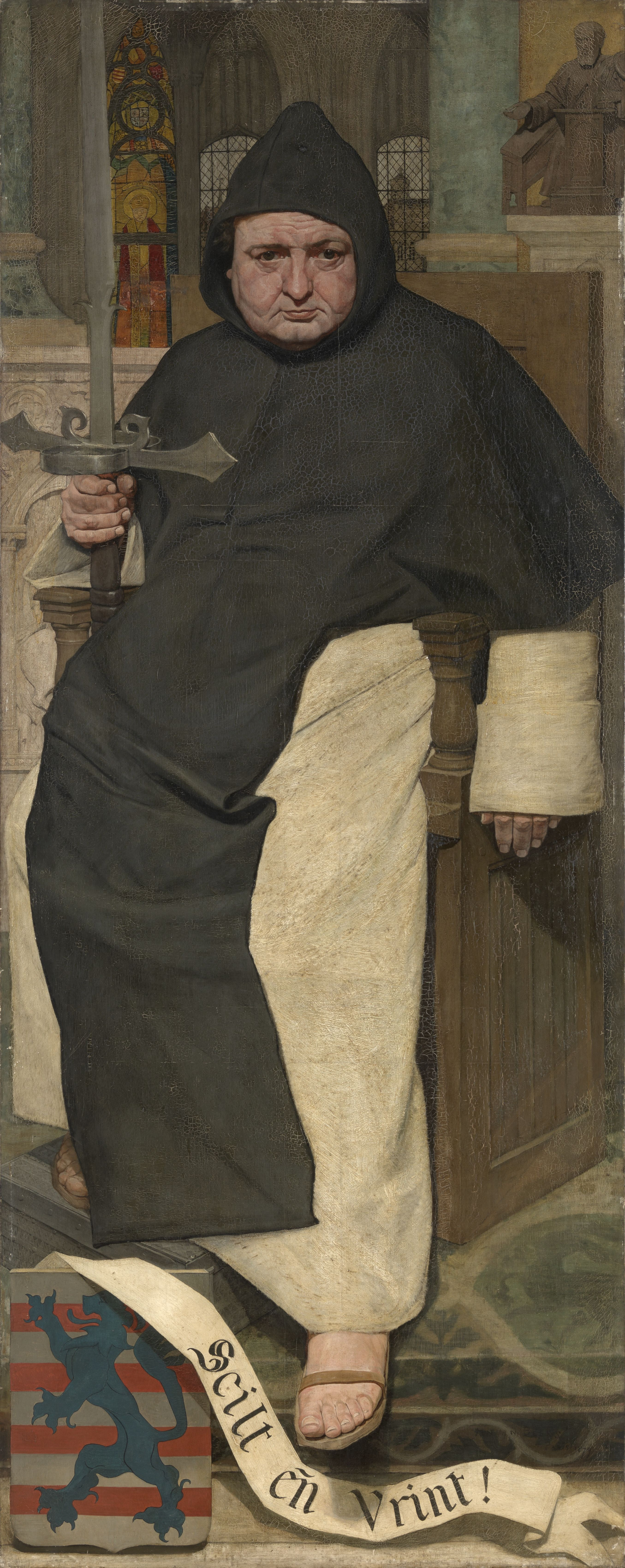
Willem van Saeftinghe, Lay Brother of Ter Doest Abbey (1879) by Belgian artist Jan Van Beers

A bronze statue of him by Jef Claerhout has stood since 1988 in the marketplace in Lissewege.
