= Aegidius de Roya =

Aegidius de Roya or Gilles de Roye (1415–1478) was a Cistercian monk, diplomat and historian.

== Life ==
Aegidius was born on 31 October 1415, possibly in Montdidier. In 1449 he obtained the Licentiate in Sacred Theology from the Collège des Bernardins in Paris. In 1452 he became a regent master and a theology lecturer. While continuing to hold academic positions at the University of Paris, de Roya also became abbot of Royaumont Abbey. Tensions developed between him and the monastic community, and in 1459 he was forced to resign. In 1460 he transferred to the Abbey of Dunes, under Abbot Johannes Crabbe.

Abbot Crabbe was involved in a number of major land reclamation projects on the Flemish coast, and De Roya became his emissary to the Burgundian court in Brussels to gain support for these. In 1463 he accompanied Abbot Crabbe to the General Chapter. He also undertook missions to London and to Troyes.

Between 1460 and 1463, de Roya compiled the world chronicles of Johannes Brando and Bartholomeus van der Beke into a Compendium historiae universalis that survives in nine different manuscript copies made in the years 1463–1485, at least six of which were intended as gifts for powerful individuals either in secular government or in the Cistercian order. De Roya's Compendium covered the known history of the world up to the year 1430, but was later continued to 1478 by Adrianus de But.

De Roya died in Bruges in 1478 and was buried at Spermalie Abbey in Sijsele.
