= Johannes de Pascuis =

Monk of the Cistercian Abbey of Dunes in the County of Flanders (1400s CE)

Jan Van der Weyden, Latinized Johannes de Pascuis, was a monk of the Cistercian Abbey of Dunes in the County of Flanders who studied at the University of Paris, graduating Licentiate of Sacred Theology in 1456. After his studies he returned to Flanders with two precious manuscripts – Expositio Origenis in Matheum (a 13th-century Latin version of Origen's Commentary on the Gospel of Matthew) and Policraticus Iohannis Salabriensis de nugis curialium (a 14th-century manuscript of John of Salisbury's Policraticus) – both of which are now in Bruges Public Library.
