= Adrianus Cancellier =

Adrianus Cancellier (1580–1623) was the 39th abbot of Dunes in the County of Flanders.

Cancellier was born in Dunkirk in 1580 and entered the Abbey of Dunes in 1597. He went on to serve as bursar, and on 30 July 1610 was elected abbot in succession to the late Andreas du Chesne. The monastery had been badly damaged in the Dutch Revolt, and Cancellier attempted a renovation of the remaining buildings, financing it by selling off parts of the medieval ruins as building materials. He also encouraged young monks to study theology. By the time of his death, the monastic community had grown to 49 in number. He was instrumental in convincing the magistrates of his native Dunkirk to establish a Jesuit college in the town. He died on 16 April 1623, and was succeeded as abbot by Bernard Campmans. In 1627 his remains were transferred to Bruges, where the community had relocated. His biography, by Charles de Visch, was published in Bruges in 1655 and reprinted in Brussels in 1660.

Catholic Church titles
Preceded by Andreas du Chesne	Abbot of Dunes; 1610 – 1623	Succeeded by Bernard Campmans
