= Robrecht Holman =

- Abbot of Ten Duinen Abbey
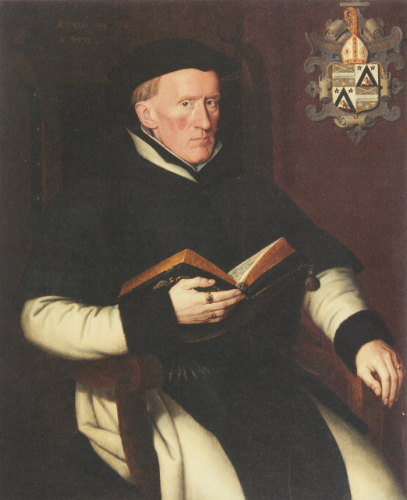
- Portrait of Robrecht Holman (1571)
- Elected: 1568
- Term ended: 1579

Personal details
- Born: 1521 Sluis, County of Flanders, Habsburg Netherlands
- Died: 29 December 1579 (aged 57–58) Bruges, County of Flanders, Habsburg Netherlands

Robrecht Holman (1521–1579) was the 36th abbot of Dunes.

== Life ==
Holman was born in Sluis in 1521 and entered the Abbey of Dunes as a youth. In 1568 he was elected abbot. His abbacy was marked by the social instability arising from the opening years of the Dutch Revolt.

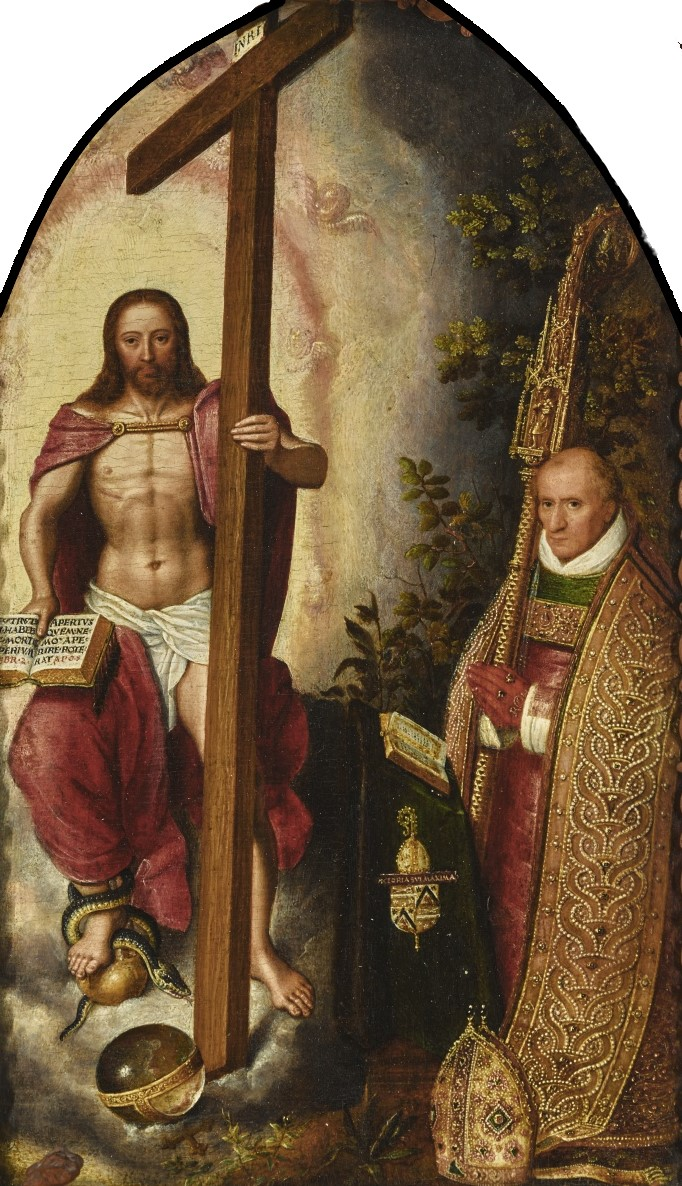
Christ the Saviour adored by Robert Holman

He died in Bruges on 29 December 1579 and was buried in an unmarked grave in the church of the Poor Clares.

Two portraits of Holman were exhibited in the 1902 Exposition des primitifs flamands à Bruges. Some scholars attribute these works to Gillis Claeissens.

Catholic Church titles
Preceded by Pierre Helline	Abbot of Dunes; 1568 – 1579	Succeeded by Laurent van den Berghe
