= Recuyell of the Historyes of Troye =

French courtly romance by Raoul Lefèvre

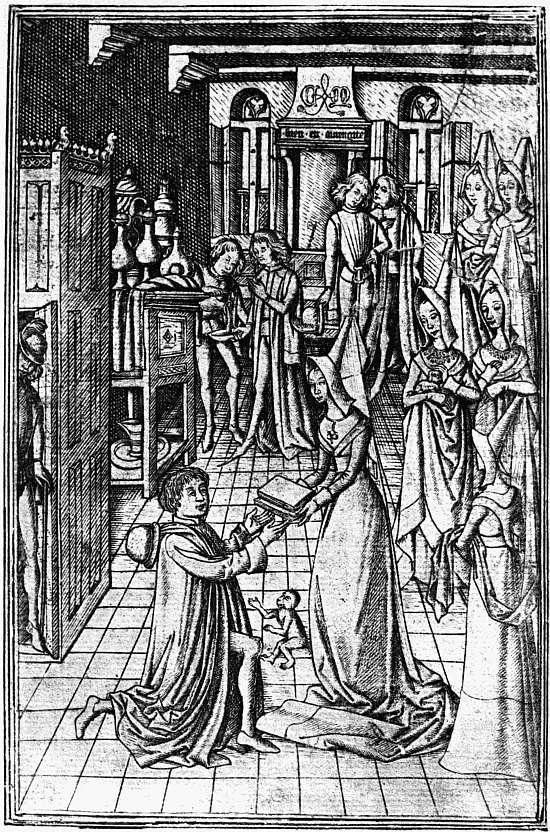
Presentation engraving showing William Caxton presenting a copy of Recuyell of the Historyes of Troye to Margaret of York

Recuyell of the Historyes of Troye or Recueil des Histoires de Troye (1464) is a translation by William Caxton of a French courtly romance written by Raoul Lefèvre, chaplain to Philip III, Duke of Burgundy. It was the first book printed in the English language.

Recuyell (recueil in Modern French) simply means "collection" in English. Hence, the work in Modern English would read "A Collection of the Histories of Troy". Caxton's translations and sometimes his titles incorporated words from other European languages.

Caxton, probably with the assistance of Colard Mansion and Johann Veldener, printed his translation in 1473 or 1474 (traditionally "ca. 1475") in Bruges. Just 18 copies still exist, and when the Duke of Northumberland sold one in 2014, it fetched more than £1 million.

A presentation copy of the first edition with a specially made engraving showing Caxton presenting the book to Margaret of York is now in the Huntington Library, California, having previously been in the collections of the Duke of Roxburghe and the Duke of Devonshire. This royal "patronage" may have been more a form of advertising than a representation of traditional medieval patronage relationships.

The English translation forms the source for the late Tudor morality play Horestes (1567).

== See also ==
- List of most expensive books and manuscripts

== Sources ==
- Bevington, David (1962) From Mankind to Marlowe: growth of structure in the popular drama of Tudor England. Cambridge, Mass.: Harvard UP ISBN 0-674-32500-1
- Farnham, Willard (1936) The Medieval Heritage of Elizabethan Tragedy. Berkeley: University of California Press (reissued by Basil Blackwell, Oxford, 1956)
- Panzer, K., ed. Short-title Catalogue of English Books. 2nd ed. STC 15375
