= Bernard Campmans =

- Abbot of Ten Duinen Abbey
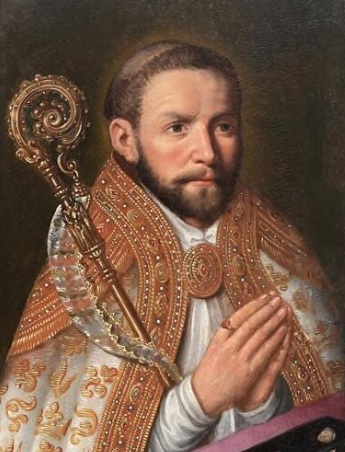
- Portrait of Abbot Campmans by an unknown artist
- Elected: 1623
- Term ended: 1642

Personal details
- Born: Douai, Walloon Flanders, Spanish Netherlands
- Died: 21 December 1642 Bruges, County of Flanders, Spanish Netherlands

Bernard Campmans (died 1642), a native of Douai, was the 40th Abbot of Dunes from 1623 to 1642. He reclaimed the rights of the defunct Ter Doest Abbey for the mother house, and was responsible for the community's re-establishment in Bruges after decades of temporary accommodation at a monastic grange following the destruction of the medieval abbey buildings in Koksijde during the Dutch Revolt.

Campmans sat in the States of Flanders and in the Estates General of 1632 for the First Estate of the County of Flanders.

He owned a 14th-century manuscript of Jacques de Vitry's Historia Occidentalis that is now in the possession of Bruges seminary, as well as a rare Delftware jug with a silver lid, now in the Gruuthusemuseum.

He died in Bruges on 21 December 1642 and was buried in the monastery chapel, his grave marked with a small white marble tombstone. On 2 May 1673 his corpse was found to be incorrupt.

Catholic Church titles
Preceded by Adrianus Cancellier	Abbot of Dunes; 1623 – 1642	Succeeded by Josse du Corron
