= Raoul Lefèvre =

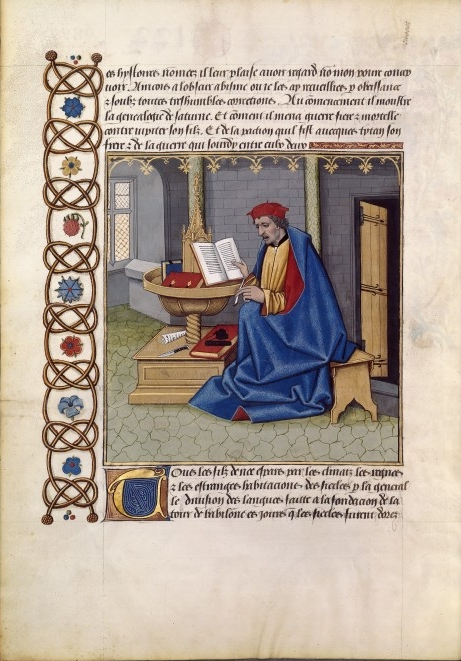
Lefèvre writing the Recueil des histoires de Troyes, image from a 16th-century manuscript

Raoul Lefèvre was the 15th-century French author of a Histoire de Jason (in 1460) and the Recoeil des histoires de Troyes (in 1464). Both books were translated and printed by William Caxton, and the latter, as Recuyell of the Historyes of Troye, was the first book printed in English in 1473–1474. Probably originating from Picardy, Lefèvre was the chaplain of Philip the Good, the creator of the Order of the Golden Fleece, which was based on the classical Jason story.

The Histoire de Jason is known from 20 manuscripts and 30 different printed editions, and was translated in English in 1477 by William Caxton, and in Dutch in 1485.
