= Idesbald =

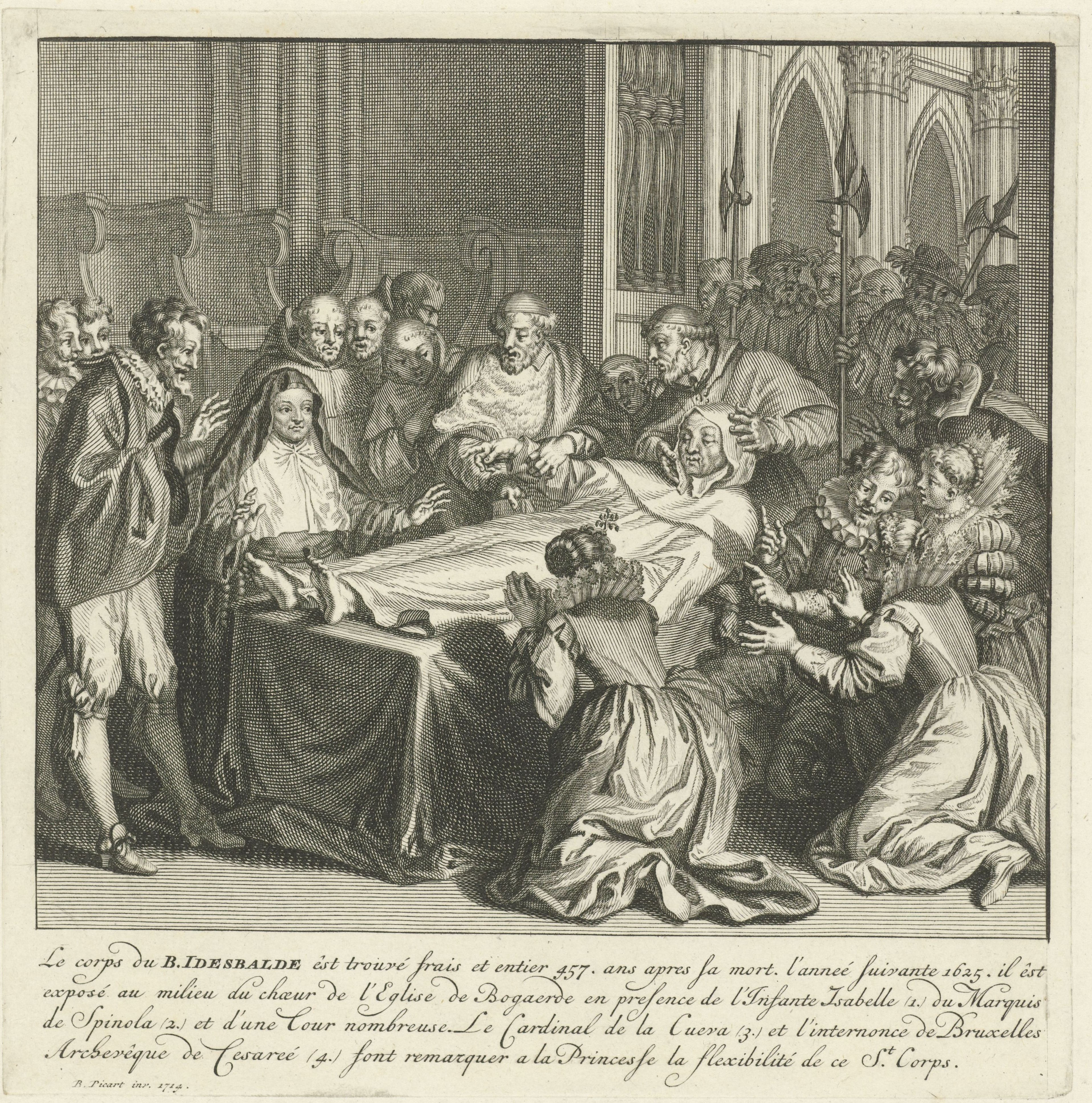
- Bernard Picart, The Incorrupt Body of St Idesbald (1714)

Abbot
- Born: c. 1100
- Died: 1167
- Venerated in: Catholic Church
- Beatified: 1894
- Major shrine: Bruges
- Feast: 18 April

Saint (Note: Some sources refer to him as blessed or Beatus rather than Saint. See saints.sqpn.com and santiebeati.it) Idesbald (Idesbaldus) (c. 1100–1167) was a Cistercian monk and abbot of Ten Duinen Abbey.

== Life ==
As a youth Idesbald was a courtier and page to the Count of Flanders. It is believed that he was related to or proceeded from the noble family of Van der Gracht, lords of Moorsel.

He became a canon priest at Veurne in 1135. In 1150, he became a Cistercian monk at the abbey of Our Lady of the Dunes (Ten Duinen), serving as abbot of this foundation from 1155 to 1167.

== Veneration ==
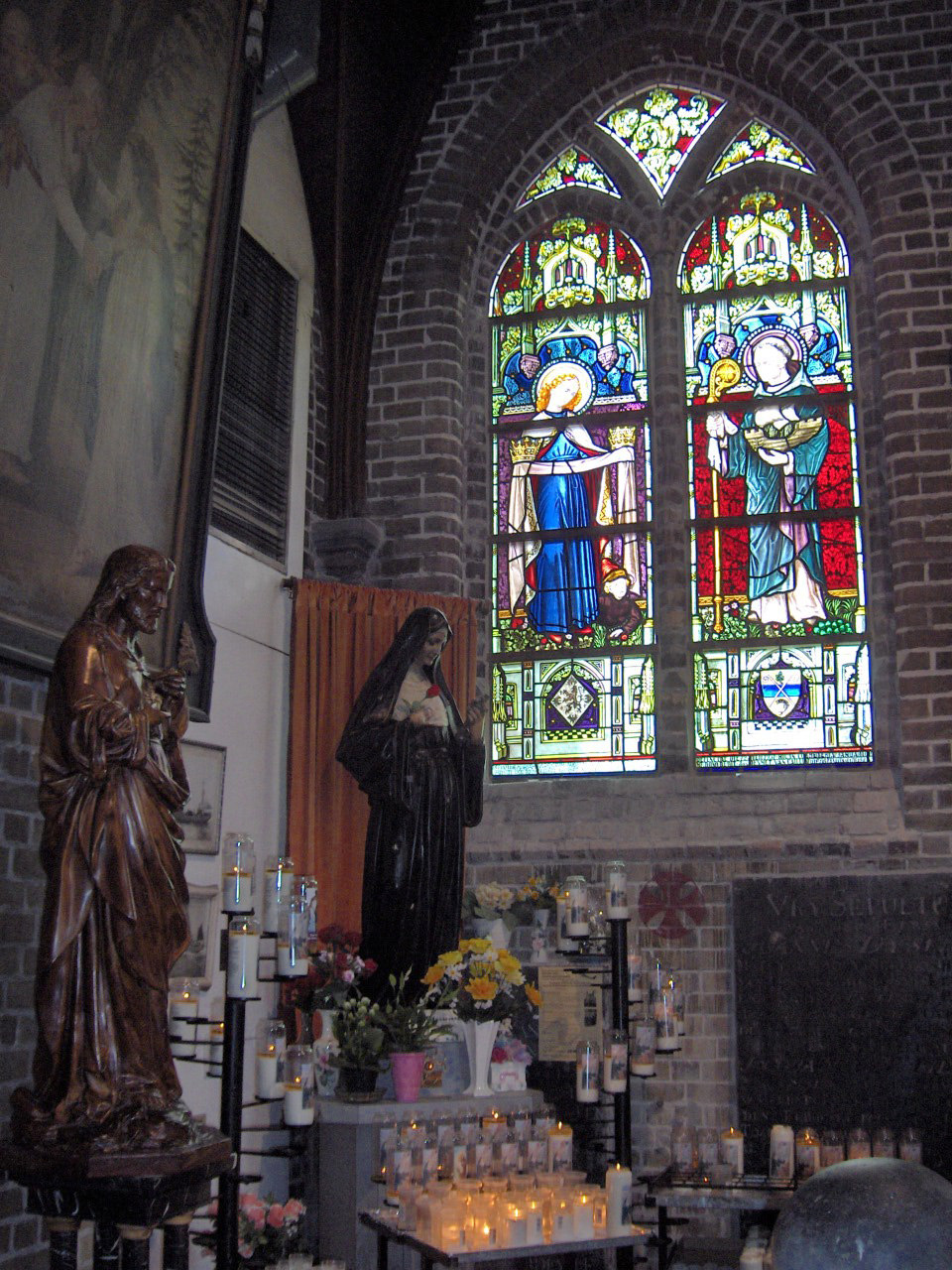
Chapel behind the Onze-Lieve-Vrouw-ter-Duinenkerk, Ostend, Belgium, with stained glass representations of Saint Godelieve and Saint Idesbald

Idesbald was buried in the abbey in a lead coffin. In 1577, the Geuzen plundered the abbey, and the monks transported Idesbald's relics to a monastic grange at Bogaerde. On 13 November 1623 his coffin was opened in the presence of several witnesses so that the relics could be inspected and authenticated; the body was reported to be incorrupt. For days, the body was shown to visitors. In 1625, during Infanta Isabella Clara Eugenia's progress through Flanders, the body was displayed to the Infanta and her court, including Ambrogio Spinola, Cardinal de la Cueva, and the papal nuncio.

Idesbald's relics were translated again, this time to Bruges, in 1796 to avoid having them destroyed by Revolutionary troops. In 1830, the relics were placed in a chapel associated with the abbey of Our Lady of the Potteries. Idesbald's cult was officially approved in 1894 by a decree issued by the Diocese of Bruges.

In 2015 the lead coffin thought to contain his remains was opened. Both lead carbonate from the coffin and the skeletal remains inside were radiocarbon-dated. The dates reveal that the remains are not those of St Idesbald, as they date to the later 15th or early 16th century. It is hypothesised that the coffin and skeleton represent the burial of a later abbot

The village of Saint-Idesbald, which gained fame as an artists' quarter, takes its name from him.

== Notes ==
Catholic Church titles
| Preceded by Alberon | Abbot of Dunes; 1155 – 1167 | Succeeded by Walter of Dikkebus |
