= Carolus Maneken =

Carolus Maneken or Carolus Virulus (or any of the spelling variations of the name, including Karel and Karolus for Carolus, Menneken, Mennicken or Meniken for Maneken, and Viruli for Virulus) (1419?-1493) was a professor at the Leuven University and the author of the Formulae Epistularum.

Carolus Maneken was born circa 1419 in either Ghent or Kassel. He studied in Leuven, and was from 1437 until his death in 1493 the first director of the "Collège du Lys" or Paedagogium Lilii, one of the four colleges of the Arts Faculty.

The Formulae Epistolarum, also known as Epistule Caroli, was a book first published in 1476 by Johann Veldener in Leuven, and reprinted dozens of times over the next few decades. It contained example letters in Latin for many occasions, and was based on the classic examples of Cicero's Epistolae ad familiares and the contemporary work by Aeneas Silvius Piccolomini, later known as Pope Pius II, which was also published in Louvain by the same publisher. The last known edition dates from 1520. In 1503, the German humanist Heinrich Bebel attacked Maneken's by then outdated work in his Commentarium epistolarum conficiendarum [...] contra epistolas Caroli. Later, the same is done by Desiderius Erasmus in De conscribendis epistolis. Spanish humanist Juan Luis Vives also discussed Maneken and his work in his 1531 book De tradendis disciplinis.
