= William Caxton =

English merchant and printer (c. 1422–c. 1491)

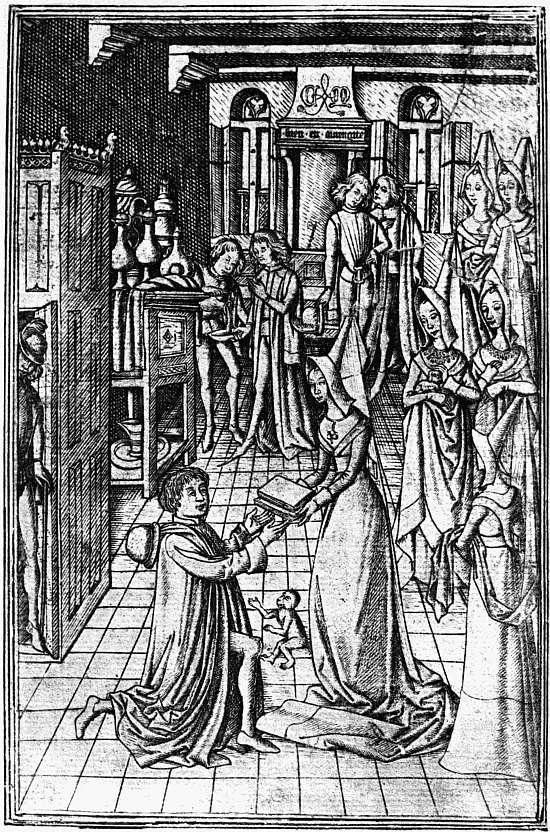
- Caxton presenting his work to Margaret of York, circa 1474
- Born: c. 1422
- Died: c. 1491 (aged c. 68–69)
- Resting place: St Margaret's, Westminster
- Occupations: Merchant; diplomat; writer; printer
- Writing career
- Period: Late Plantagenet; early English Renaissance
- Notable works: Recuyell of the Historyes of Troye; Dictes or Sayengis of the Philosophres; Brut Chronicles

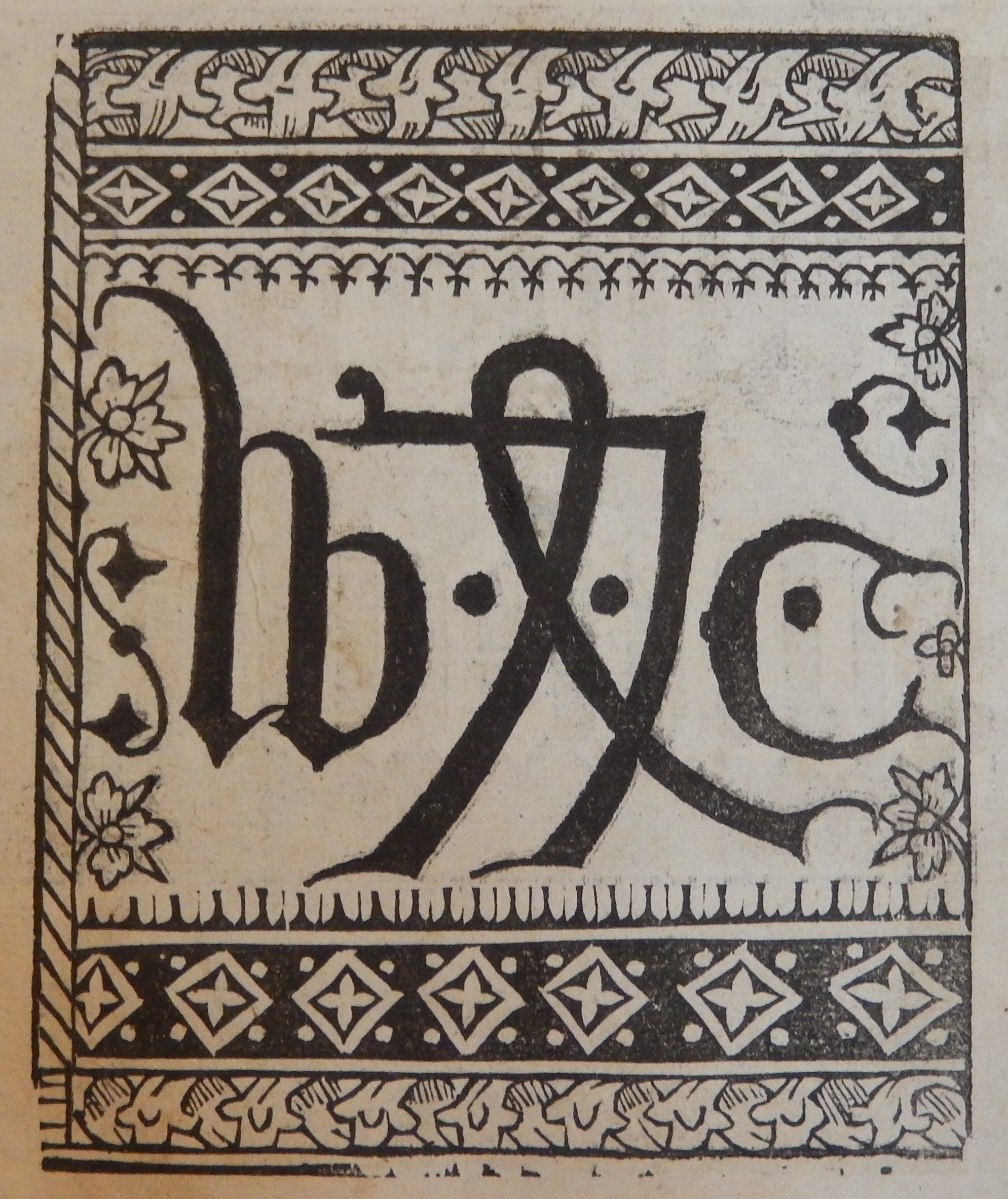
Printer's mark of William Caxton, 1478. A variant of the merchant's mark

William Caxton (c. 1422 – c. 1491) was an English merchant, diplomat and writer. He is thought to be the first person to introduce a printing press into England in 1476, and as a printer to be the first English retailer of printed books.

His parentage and date of birth are not known for certain, but he may have been born between 1415 and 1424, perhaps in the Weald or wood land of Kent, perhaps in Hadlow or Tenterden. In 1438 he was apprenticed to Robert Large, a wealthy London silk mercer.

Shortly after Large's death, Caxton moved to Bruges, Flanders, a wealthy cultured city in which he was settled by 1450. Successful in business, he became governor of the Company of Merchant Adventurers of London; on his business travels, he observed the new printing industry in Cologne, which led him to start a printing press in Bruges in collaboration with Colard Mansion. When Margaret of York, sister of Edward IV, married the Duke of Burgundy, they moved to Bruges and befriended Caxton. Margaret encouraged Caxton to complete his translation of the Recuyell of the Historyes of Troye, a collection of stories associated with Homer's Iliad, which he did in 1471.

On his return to England, heavy demand for his translation prompted Caxton to set up a press at Westminster in 1476. Although the first book that he is known to have produced was an edition of Chaucer's The Canterbury Tales, he went on to publish chivalric romances, classical works and English and Roman histories and to edit many others. He was the first to translate Aesop's Fables in 1484. Caxton was not an adequate translator, and under pressure to publish as much as possible as quickly as possible, he sometimes simply transferred French words into English; but because of the success of his translations, he is credited with helping to promote Chancery Standard (a London dialect of Middle English) that he used to the status of standard dialect throughout England.

In 2002, Caxton was named among the 100 Greatest Britons in a BBC poll.

== Biography ==
=== Early life ===
Caxton's family "fairly certainly" consisted of his parents, Philip and Dionisia, and a brother, Philip. However, the charters used as evidence there are for the manor of Little Wratting in Suffolk; in one charter, this William Caxton is referred to as "otherwise called Causton saddler".

One possible candidate for William's father is Thomas Caxton of Tenterden, Kent, who was like William, a mercer. He was one of the defendants in a case in the Court of Common Pleas in Easter term 1420: Kent. John Okman, versus "Thomas Kaxton, of Tentyrden, mercer", and Joan who was the wife of Thomas Ive, executors of Thomas Ive, for the return of two bonds (scripta obligatoria) which they unjustly retain.

Caxton's date of birth is unknown. Records place it in 1415–1424, based on the fact that his apprenticeship fees were paid in 1438. Caxton would have been 14 at the date of apprenticeship, but masters often paid the fees late. In the preface to his first printed work The Recuyell of the Historyes of Troye, he claims to have been born and educated in the Weald of Kent. Oral tradition in Tonbridge claims that Caxton was born there; the same with Tenterden. One of the manors of Hadlow was Caustons, owned by the Caxton (De Causton) family. A house in Hadlow reputed to be the birthplace of William Caxton was dismantled in 1936 and incorporated into a larger house rebuilt in Forest Row, East Sussex. Further evidence for Hadlow is that various place names nearby are frequently mentioned by Caxton.

Caxton was in London by 1438, when the registers of the Mercers' Company record his apprenticeship to Robert Large, a wealthy London mercer or dealer in luxury goods, who served as Master of the Mercers' Company, and Lord Mayor of London in 1439. After Large died in 1441, Caxton was left a small sum of money (£20). As other apprentices were left larger sums, it would seem that he was not a senior apprentice at this time.

=== Printing and later life ===
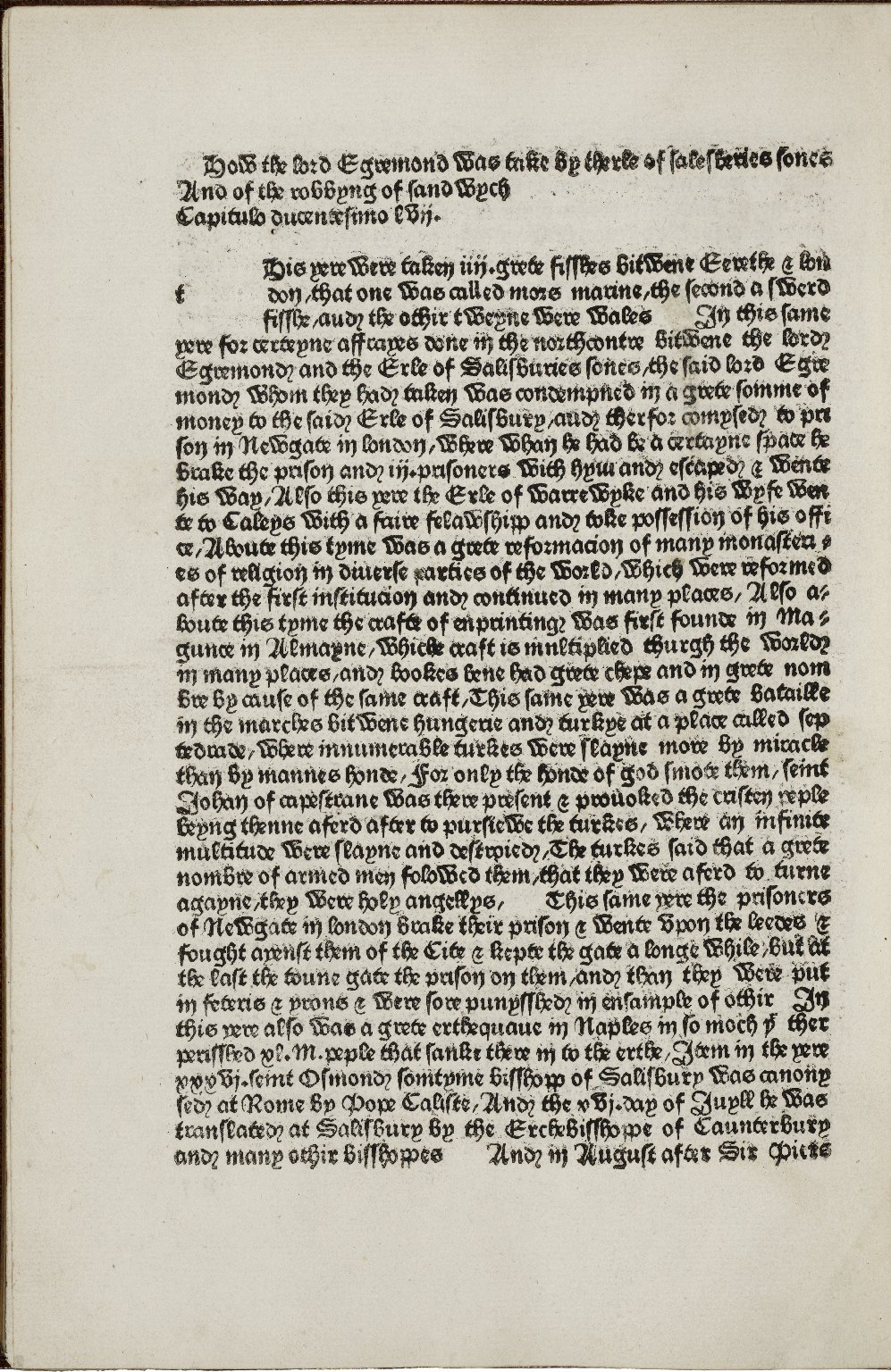
A page from the Brut Chronicle (printed as the Chronicles of England), printed in 1480 by Caxton in blackletter

Caxton was making trips to Bruges by 1450 and had settled there by 1453, when he may have taken his Liberty of the Mercers' Company. There, he was successful in business and became governor of the Company of Merchant Adventurers of London. His trade brought him into contact with Burgundy and it was thus that he became a member of the household of Margaret, Duchess of Burgundy, the third wife of Charles the Bold and sister of two kings of England: Edward IV and Richard III. That led to more continental travel, including to Cologne, in the course of which he observed the new printing industry and was significantly influenced by German printing.

He wasted no time in setting up a printing press in Bruges in collaboration with a Fleming, Colard Mansion, and the first book to be printed in English was produced in 1473: Recuyell of the Historyes of Troye was a translation by Caxton himself. In the epilogue of the book, Caxton tells how his "pen became worn, his hand weary, his eye dimmed" with copying the book by hand and so he "practiced and learnt" how to print it. His translation had become popular in the Burgundian court, and requests for copies of it were the stimulus for him to set up a press.

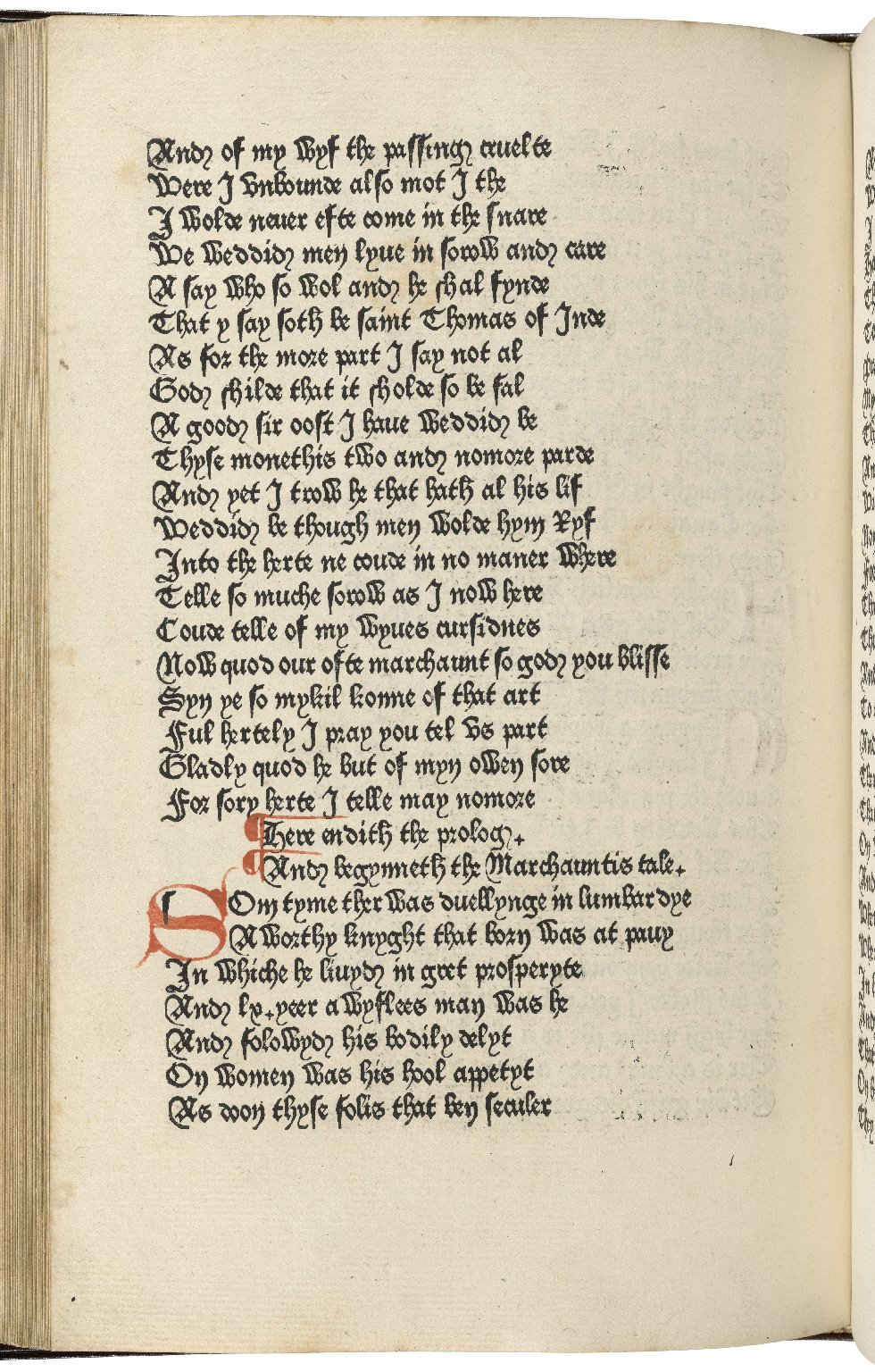
Caxton's 1476 edition of Chaucer's Canterbury Tales

Bringing the knowledge back to England, he set up the country's first-ever press in The Almonry area of Westminster in 1476. The first book known to have been produced there was an edition of Chaucer's The Canterbury Tales (Blake, 2004–07). Another early title was Dictes or Sayengis of the Philosophres (Sayings of the Philosophers), first printed on 18 November 1477, translated by Earl Rivers, the king's brother-in-law. Caxton's translations of the Golden Legend (1483) and The Book of the Knight in the Tower (1484) contain perhaps the earliest verses of the Bible to be printed in English. He produced the first translation of Ovid's Metamorphoses in English. His translation of the Golden Legend was based on the French translation of Jean de Vignay.

Caxton produced chivalric romances (such as Fierabras), the most important of which was Sir Thomas Malory's Le Morte d'Arthur (1485); classical works; and English and Roman histories. These books appealed to the English upper classes in the late 15th century. Caxton was supported by (but not dependent on) members of the nobility and the gentry. He may also have been paid by the authors of works such as Lorenzo Gulielmo Traversagni, who wrote the Epitome margaritae eloquentiae, which Caxton published c. 1480.

The John Rylands Library in Manchester holds the second-largest collection of printing by Caxton, after the British Library's collection. Of the Rylands collection of more than 60 examples, 36 are complete and unsophisticated copies and four are unique.

=== Death and memorials ===
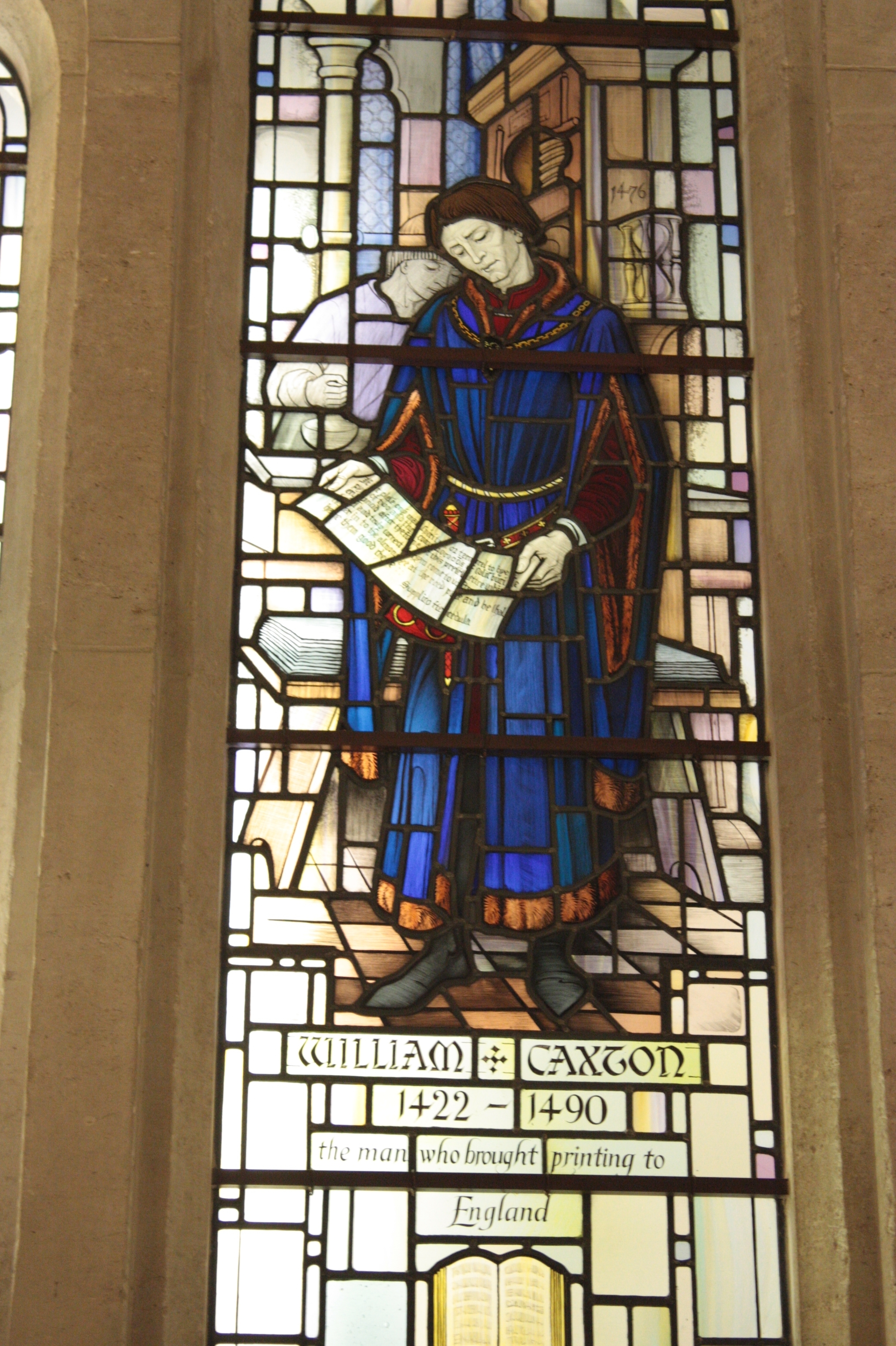
Stained glass to William Caxton, Guildhall, London

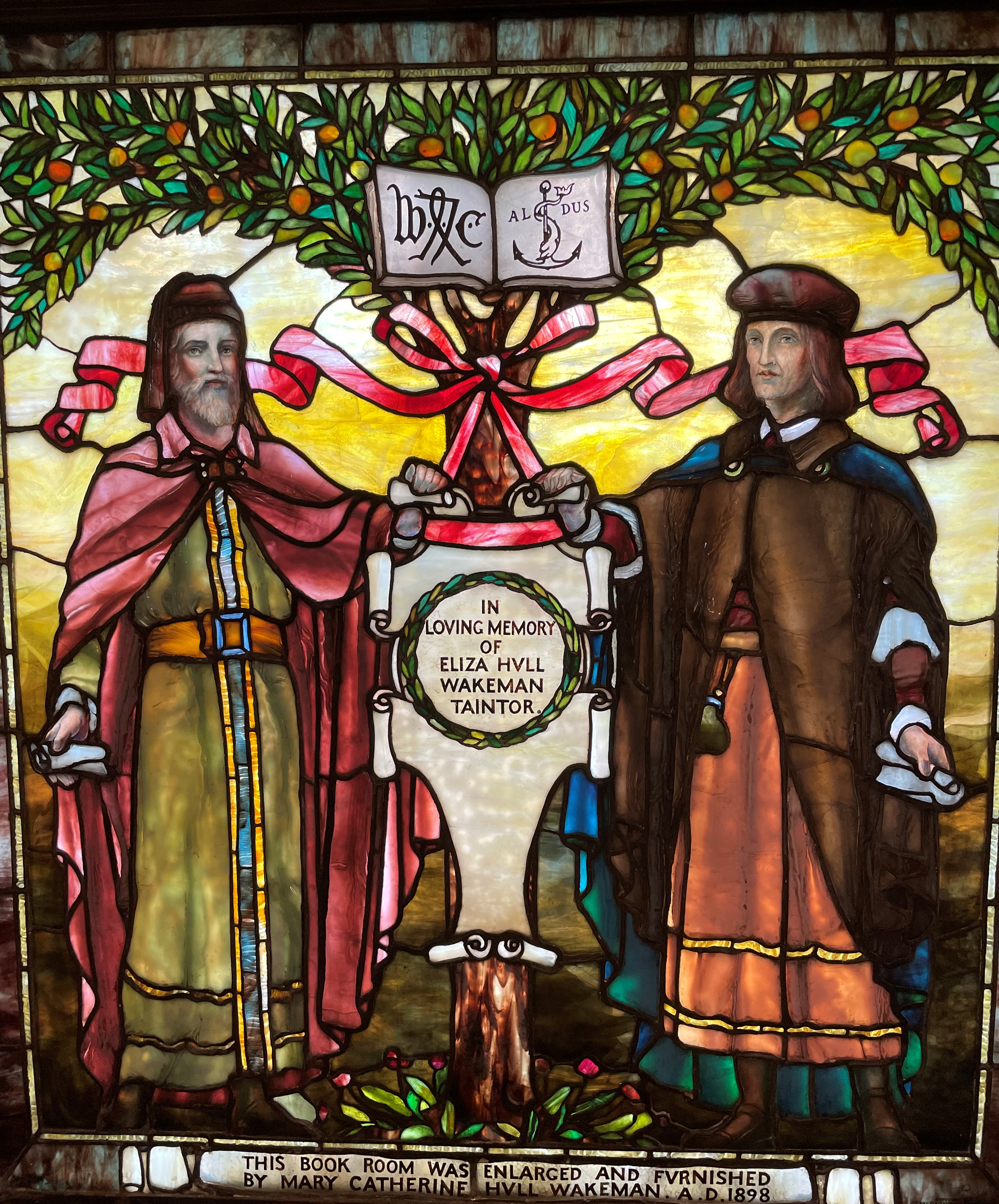
Stained glass, by Tiffany, of William Caxton and Aldus Manutius. Shows printers device. Pequot Library, Southport

Caxton's precise date of death is uncertain, but estimates from the records of his burial in St. Margaret's, Westminster, suggest that he died near March 1492. However, George D. Painter makes numerous references to the year 1491 in his book William Caxton: a biography as the year of Caxton's death since 24 March was the last day of the year according to the calendar that used at the time and so the year change had not yet happened. Painter writes, "However, Caxton's own output reveals the approximate time of his death, for none of his books can be later than 1491, and even those which are assignable to that year are hardly enough for a full twelve months' production; so a date of death towards autumn of 1491 could be deduced even without confirmation of documentary evidence."

Wynkyn de Worde, a Fleming, became the owner of the printing plant after Caxton's death and carried it on for forty-three years. Wynkyn prospered, continuing to put out a steady succession of editions of the small popular pamphlets which were started in Caxton's time.

In 1820, a memorial tablet to Caxton was provided in St Margaret's by the Roxburghe Club and its President, Earl Spencer.

In November 1954, a memorial to Caxton was unveiled in Westminster Abbey by J. J. Astor, chairman of the Press Council. The white stone plaque is on the wall next to the door to Poets' Corner. The inscription reads:

Near this place William Caxton set up the first printing press in England.

In 1976 the Quincentenary of the Introduction of Printing into England exhibit was held at the British Library. There were forty-five events during the quincentenary including the Caxton International Congress at the Printing Historical Society, and exhibits at the John Rylands Library, Westminster Abbey, and Cambridge University Library.

== Caxton and the English language ==
Caxton printed 68 percent of his works in the English language. He translated a large number of works into English and performed much of the translation and the editing work himself. He is credited with printing as many as 108 books, 87 of which were different titles, including the first English translation of Aesop's Fables (26 March 1484). Caxton also translated 26 of the titles himself. His major guiding principle in translating was an honest desire to provide the most linguistically exact replication of foreign language texts into English, but the hurried publishing schedule and his inadequate skill as a translator often led to wholesale transference of French words into English and to numerous misunderstandings.

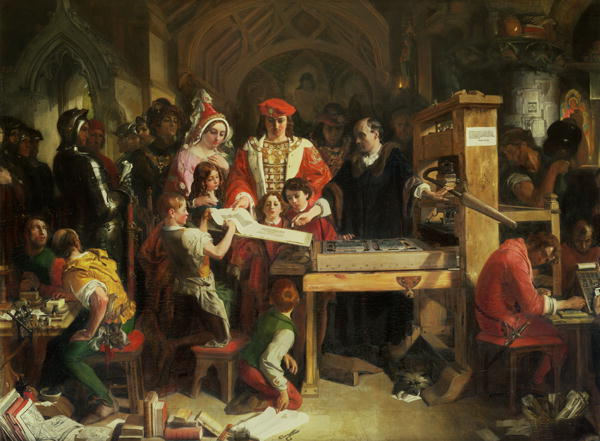
Caxton showing the first specimen of his printing to King Edward IV and Queen Elizabeth at the Almonry, Westminster (Caxton Showing the First Specimen of His Printing to King Edward IV by Daniel Maclise, 1851)

The English language was changing rapidly in Caxton's time, and the works that he was given to print were in a variety of styles and dialects. Caxton was a technician, rather than a writer, and he often faced dilemmas concerning language standardisation in the books that he printed. He wrote about that subject in the preface to his Eneydos. His successor Wynkyn de Worde faced similar problems.

Caxton is credited with standardising the English language through printing by homogenising regional dialects and largely adopting the London dialect. That facilitated the expansion of English vocabulary, the regularisation of inflection and syntax and a widening gap between the spoken and the written words. Richard Pynson started printing in London in 1491 or 1492 and favoured what came to be called Chancery Standard, largely based on the London dialect. Pynson was a more accomplished stylist than Caxton and consequently pushed the English language further toward standardisation.

It is asserted that the spelling of "ghost" with the silent letter h was adopted by Caxton from the influence of Flemish spelling habits.

=== Caxton's "egges" anecdote ===
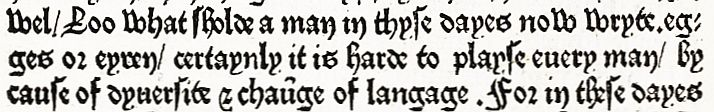
The famous fragment about eggs in the original edition

In Caxton's prologue to the 1490 edition of his translation of Virgil's Aeneid, called by him Eneydos, he refers to the problems of finding a standardised English. Caxton recounts what took place when a boat sailing from London to Zeeland was becalmed, and landed on the Kent side of the Thames.

A mercer called Sheffield was from the north of England. He went into a house and asked the "good wyf" if he could buy some "egges". She replied that she could not speak French, which annoyed him, as he could also not speak French. A bystander suggested that Sheffield was asking for "eyren", which the woman said she understood. After recounting the interaction, Caxton wrote: "Loo what ſholde a man in thyſe dayes now wryte egges or eyren/ certaynly it is harde to playſe euery man/ by cauſe of dyuerſite ⁊ chaũge of langage" ("Lo, what should a man in these days now write: egges or eyren? Certainly it is hard to please every man because of diversity and change of language").

== Sources ==
- Blades, William (1861–63). The Life and Typography of William Caxton, England's First Printer (2 vols.), London: Joseph Lilly.
- Blake, Norman Francis (2004). "Caxton, William (1415x24–1492), printer, merchant, and diplomat". Oxford Dictionary of National Biography (online ed.). Oxford University Press. doi:10.1093/ref:odnb/4963. ISBN 978-0-19-861412-8. (Subscription, Wikipedia Library access or UK public library membership required.)
- Blake, Norman Francis (1976). Caxton: England's First Publisher. London: Barnes and Noble. ISBN 0064904504.
- Blake, Norman Francis (1991). William Caxton and English Literary Culture. A&C Black. ISBN 1852850515.
- Blake, Norman Francis (1969). Caxton and His World. Deutsch. ISBN 0233960937.
- British Library Reference Division (1976). William Caxton: an exhibition to commemorate the quincentenary of the introduction of printing into England; 24 September 1976 – 31 January 1977. London: British Museum Publications. ISBN 0-7141-0388-8.
- Childs, Edmund (1976). William Caxton: A Portrait in a Background. Northwood Publications.
- Chisholm, Hugh, ed. (1911). "Caxton, William". Encyclopædia Britannica. 5 (11th ed.). Cambridge University Press. pp. 587–588.
- Day, Matthew. "William Caxton and Vernacular Classicism." English Studies 103, no. 1 (2022): 19–41.
- De Ricci, Seymour (2010). A Census of Caxtons. General Books LLC. ISBN 978-1-151-95867-9.
- Deacon, Richard (1976). William Caxton: The First English Editor, Printer, Merchant and Translator. London: Frederick Muller.
- Duff, Edward Gordon (1905). William Caxton. Chicago: Caxton Club.
- Duff, Gordon (2022). The Introduction of Printing into England and the Early Work of the Press. The Cambridge History of English and American Literature. Vol. II ch XIII.
- Hellinga, Lotte (1982). Caxton in Focus: The Beginning of Printing in England. London: The British Library. ISBN 978-0-90465-476-9
- Hellinga, Lotte (2010). William Caxton and Early Printing in England. London: The British Library. ISBN 978-0-71235-088-4
- Hindley, Geoffrey (1979). England in the Age of Caxton. London: Granada. ISBN 978-0-24610-878-4
- James‐Maddocks, Holly. "Illuminated Caxtons and the Trade in Printed Books", The Library, Volume 22, Issue 3, September 2021, pp. 291–315.
- Knight, Charles (1844). William Caxton: The First English Printer. A Biography. Charles Knight & Co.
- Lee, Sidney (1887). "Caxton, William". In Dictionary of National Biography. 9. London. pp. 381–389.
- Loades, David, ed. Reader's Guide to British History (2003) 1: 236–237.
- Painter, George Duncan (1976). William Caxton: A Quincentenary Biography of England's First Printer. London: Chatto and Windus. ISBN 070112198X.
- Plomer, Henry R. (1925). William Caxton (1424–1491). Leonard Parsons
- Plomer, Henry R. (1925). Wynkyn de Worde & His Contemporaries, from the Death of Caxton to 1535. A Chapter in English Printing. Grafton & Co.
- Stuart, Dorothy Margaret. (1960). "William Caxton: Mercer, Translator, and Master Printer" History Today 10:4 pp. 256–264.
