= Lissewege =

Sub-municipality of the city of Bruges, Belgium

- Sub-municipality of Bruges
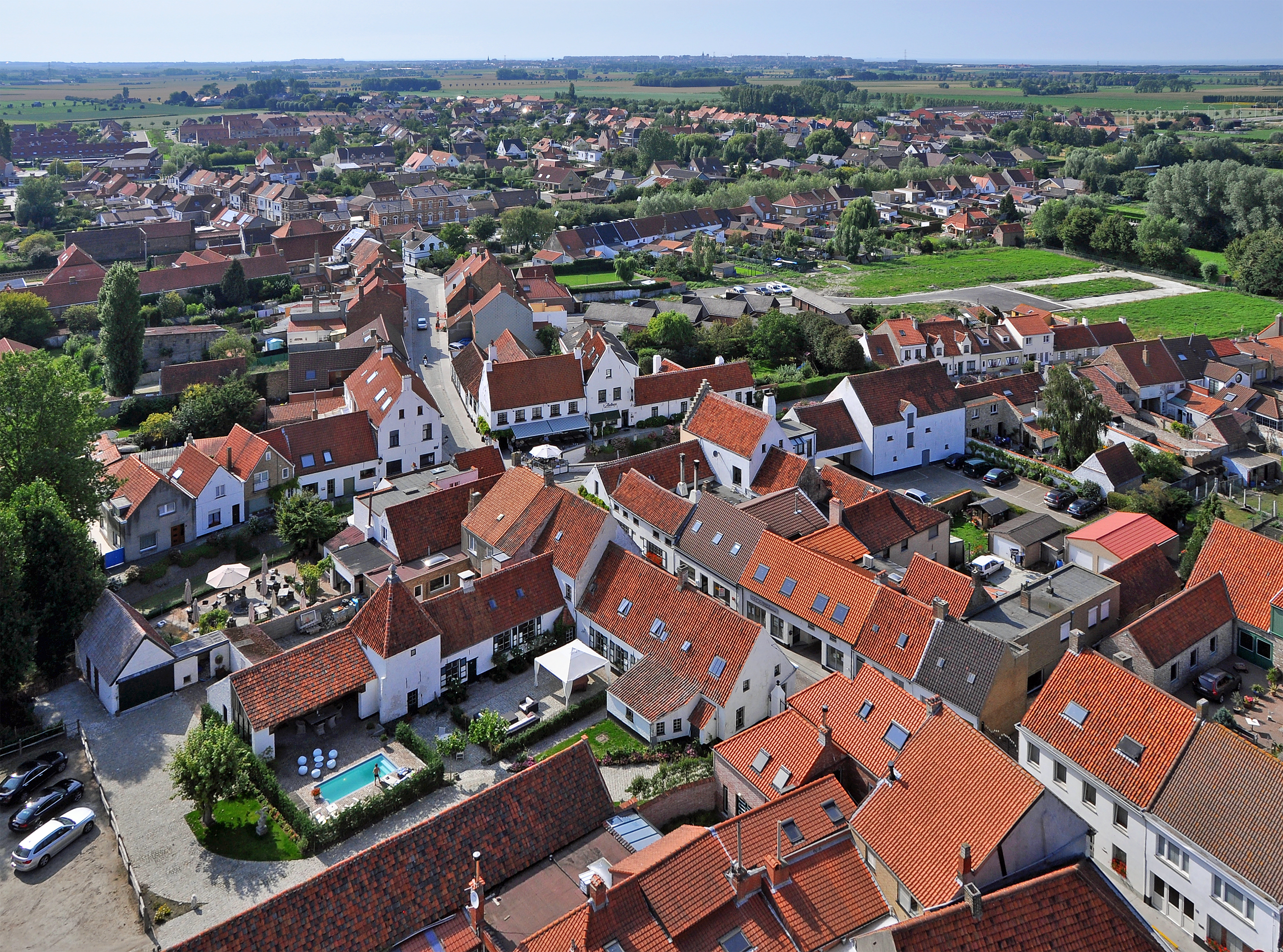
- View of Lissewege

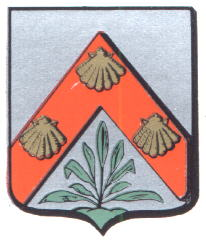
- Coat of arms
- Interactive map of Lissewege
- Location within Belgium Location within West Flanders
- Coordinates: 51°17′39″N 3°11′56″E
- Country: Belgium
- Community: Flemish Community
- Region: Flemish Region
- Province: West Flanders
- Arrondissement: Bruges
- Municipality: Bruges

Area
  - Total: 26.80 km^{2} (10.35 sq mi)

Population (2014-12-31)
  - Total: 7,412
  - Density: 276.6/km^{2} (716.3/sq mi)
- Postal codes: 8380
- Area codes: 050

Lissewege (Dutch pronunciation: [ˈlɪsəˌʋeːɣə]) is a sub-municipality of the city of Bruges located in the province of West Flanders, Flemish Region, Belgium. It was a separate municipality until 1971. On 1 January 1971, it was merged into Bruges. Lissewege also includes Zeebrugge and Zwankendamme.

== Gallery ==
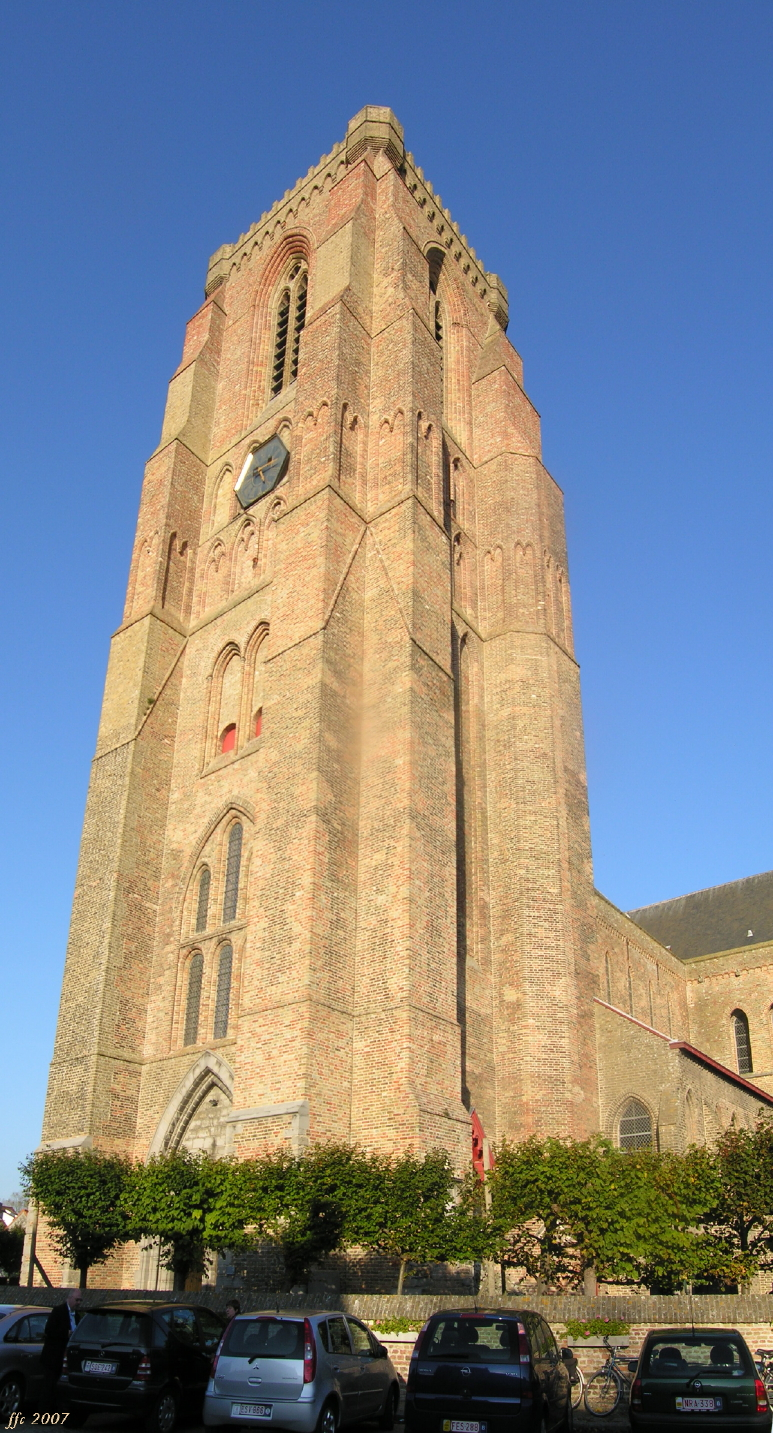
Bell tower of Our Lady's Church (13th century)

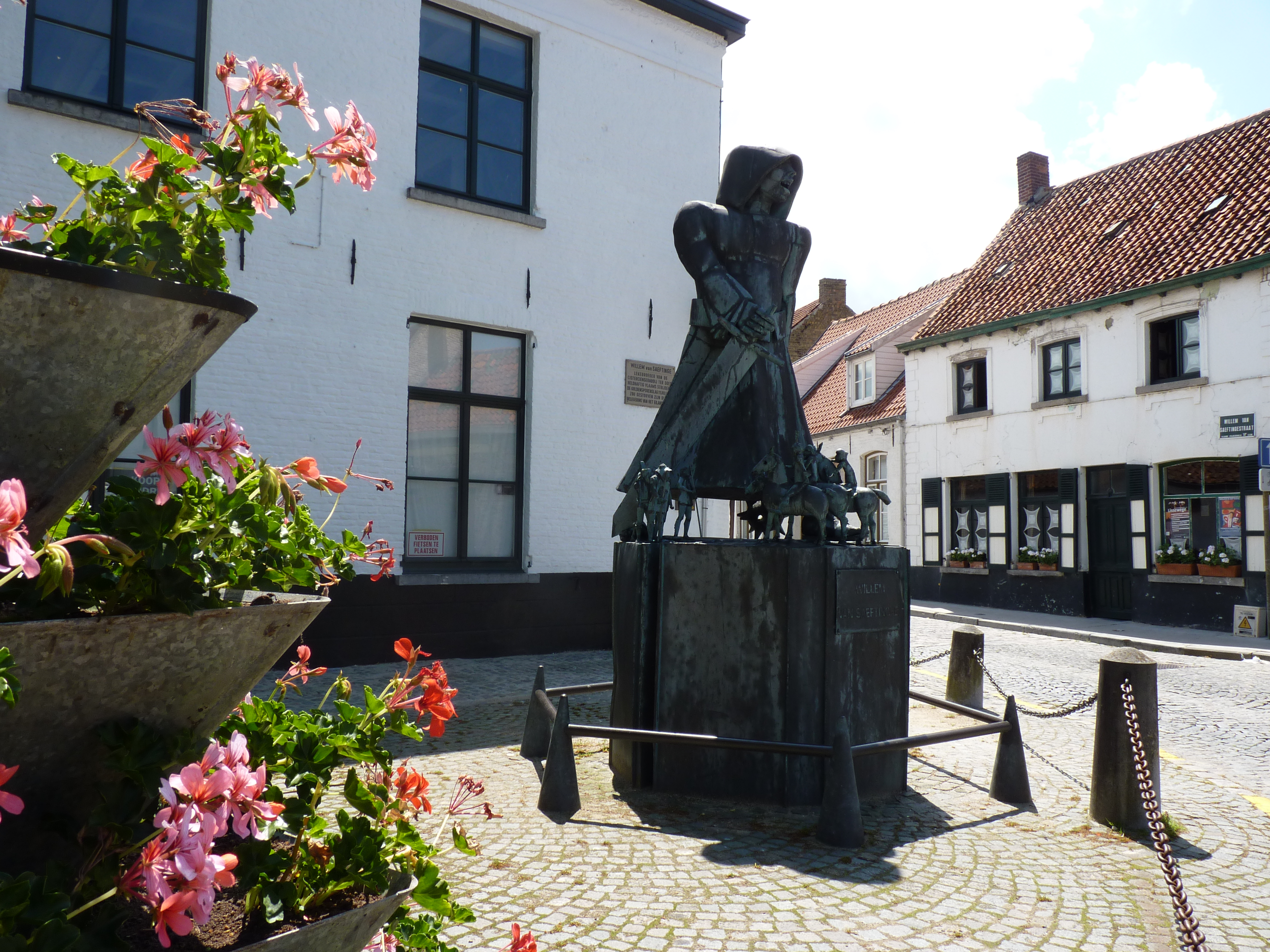
Statue of Willem van Saeftinghe by Jef Claerhout

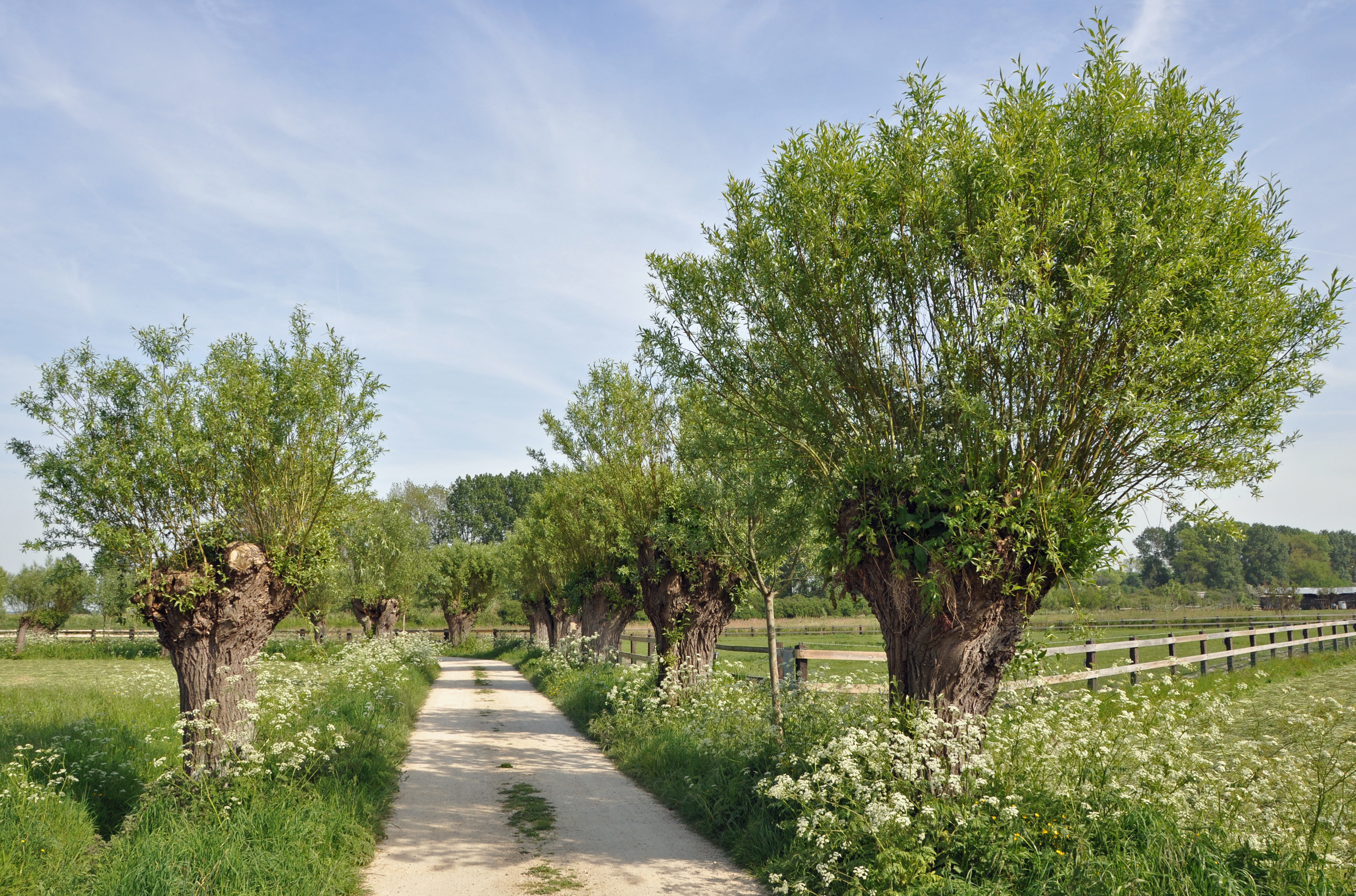
The Oude Pastoriestraat ("Old Presbytery street")

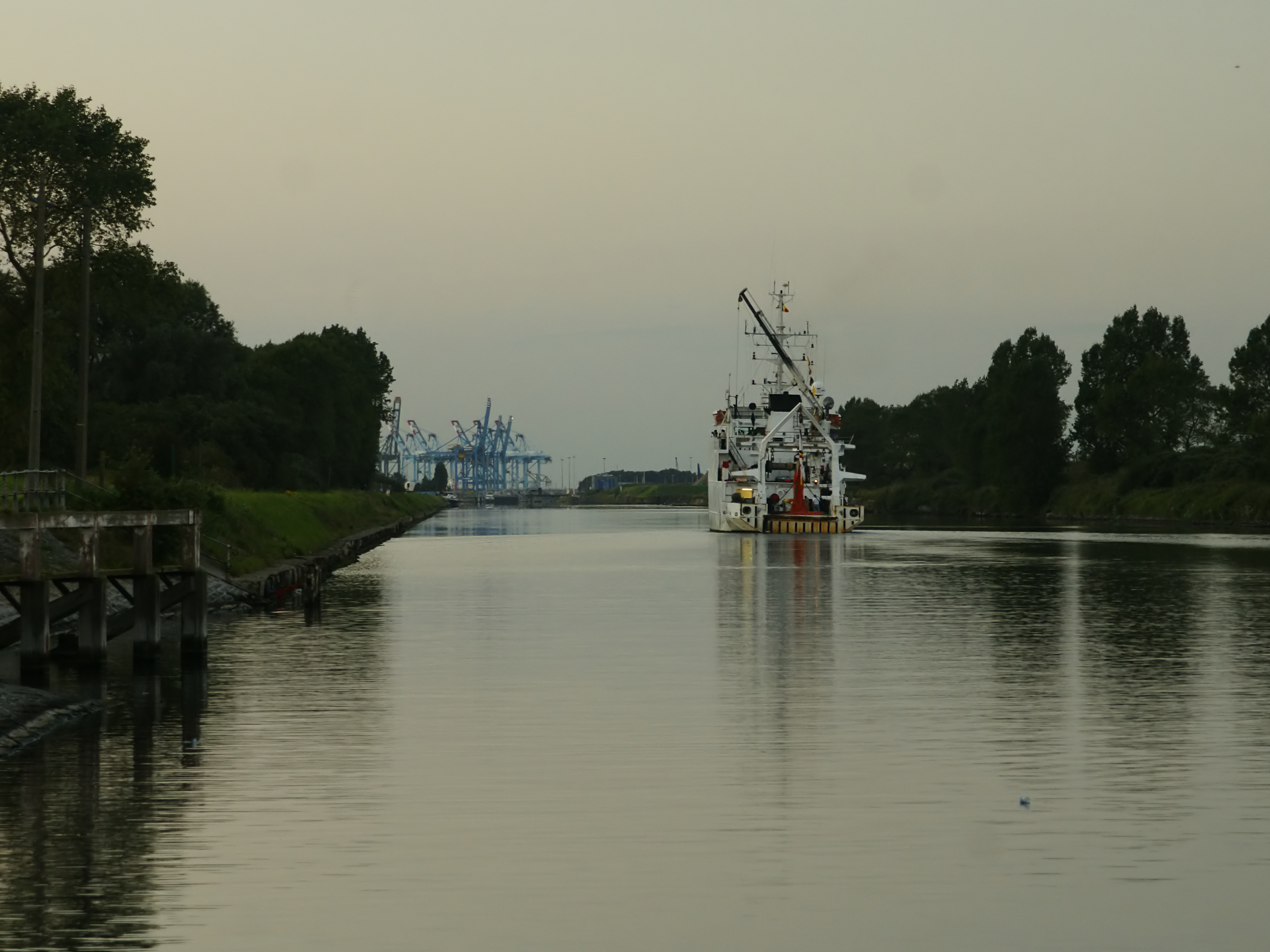
The RV Belgica (A962) in the Boudewijnkanaal near Lissewege
