= Ter Doest Abbey =

Cistercian abbey in Belgium

Coordinates: 51.28197°N 3.2024°E

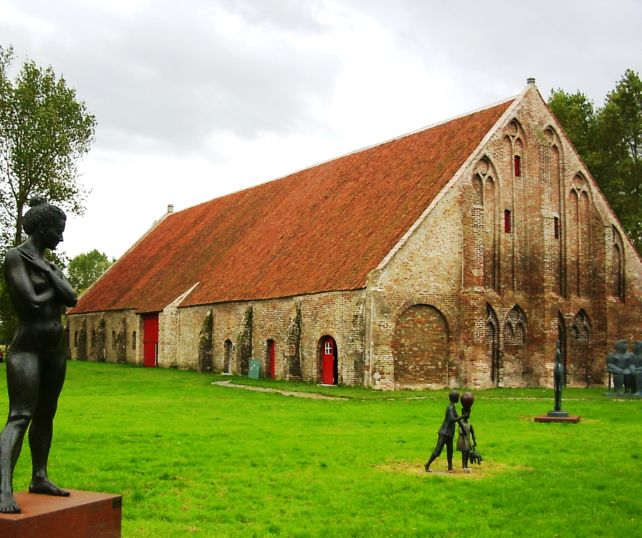
Tithe barn

Ter Doest Abbey (Dutch: Abdij Ter Doest) was a Cistercian abbey in Belgium, in the present Lissewege, a district of Bruges, West Flanders.

== History ==
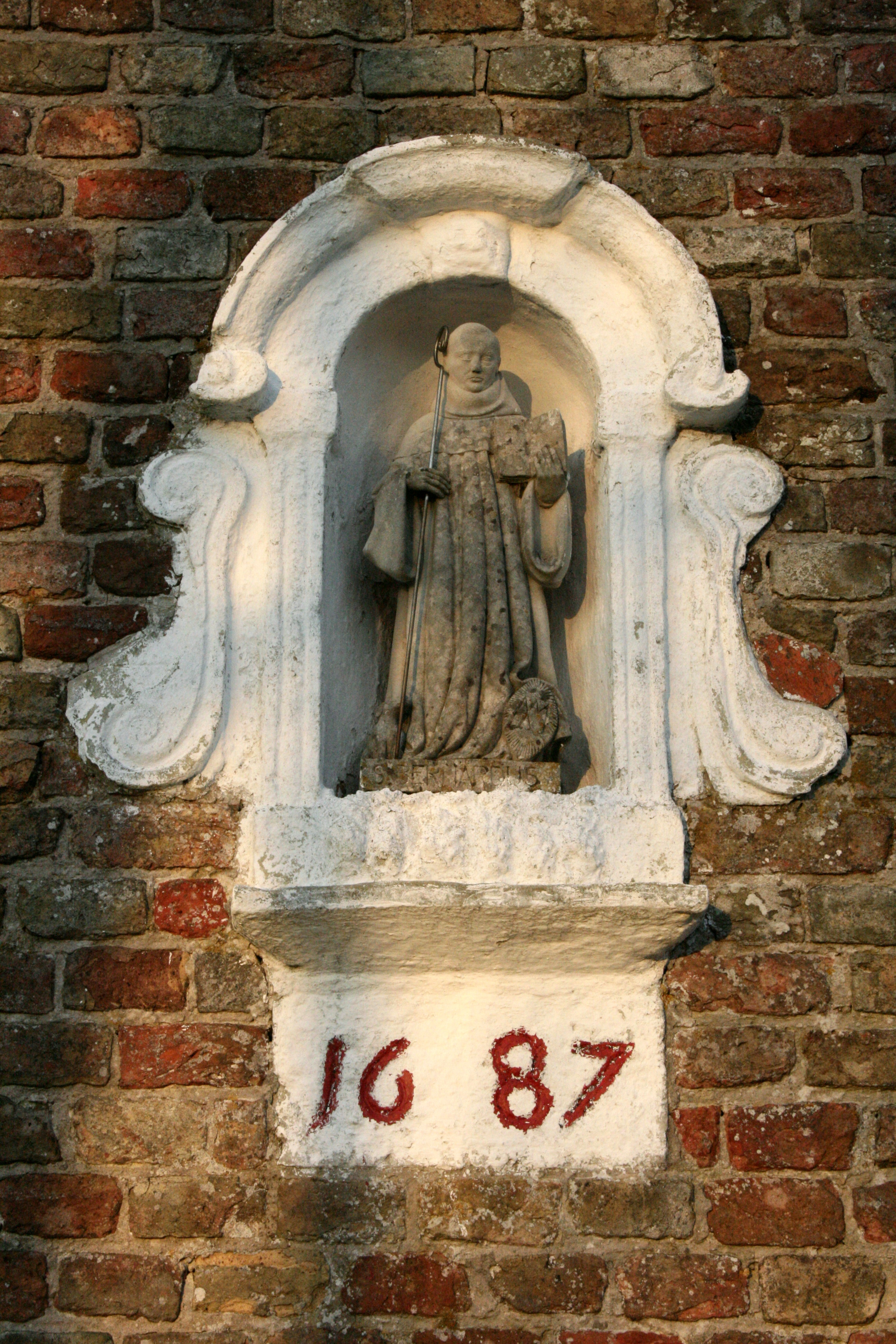
Statue of Saint Bernard on chapel

Lambert, lord of Lissewege, left an estate with a chapel in 1106 to the Benedictines, who built an abbey there. This affiliated itself to the Cistercian order in 1175 as a daughter house of Ten Duinen Abbey in Koksijde, of the filiation of Clairvaux. It had a daughter house of its own, the Abbey of Onze Lieve Vrouw Kamer, founded in 1223.

The abbey played an important part in the building of dykes and the reclamation of land in the coastal areas of Flanders, Zeeland and Holland, and also in the wool trade.

Saint Thorfinn, otherwise Thorfinn of Hamar, exiled bishop of Hamar in Norway, took refuge at Ter Doest after his opposition to King Eric II of Norway. He died in the abbey on 8 January 1285 and was buried there.

Willem van Saeftinghe, a lay brother of Ter Doest, fought with the Flemish in the Battle of the Golden Spurs in 1302, where he is said to have unhorsed the French leader, Robert, Count of Artois, whereupon other Flemish soldiers killed him. In 1308 during a revolt of the lay brothers, Willem killed the cellarer of the abbey, and injured the abbot, Willem van Cordewaegen, so badly that he nearly died.

In 1624 Ter Doest was united with Ten Duinen, which in 1627 moved to Bruges. It was dissolved in the French Revolution in 1796.

== Buildings ==
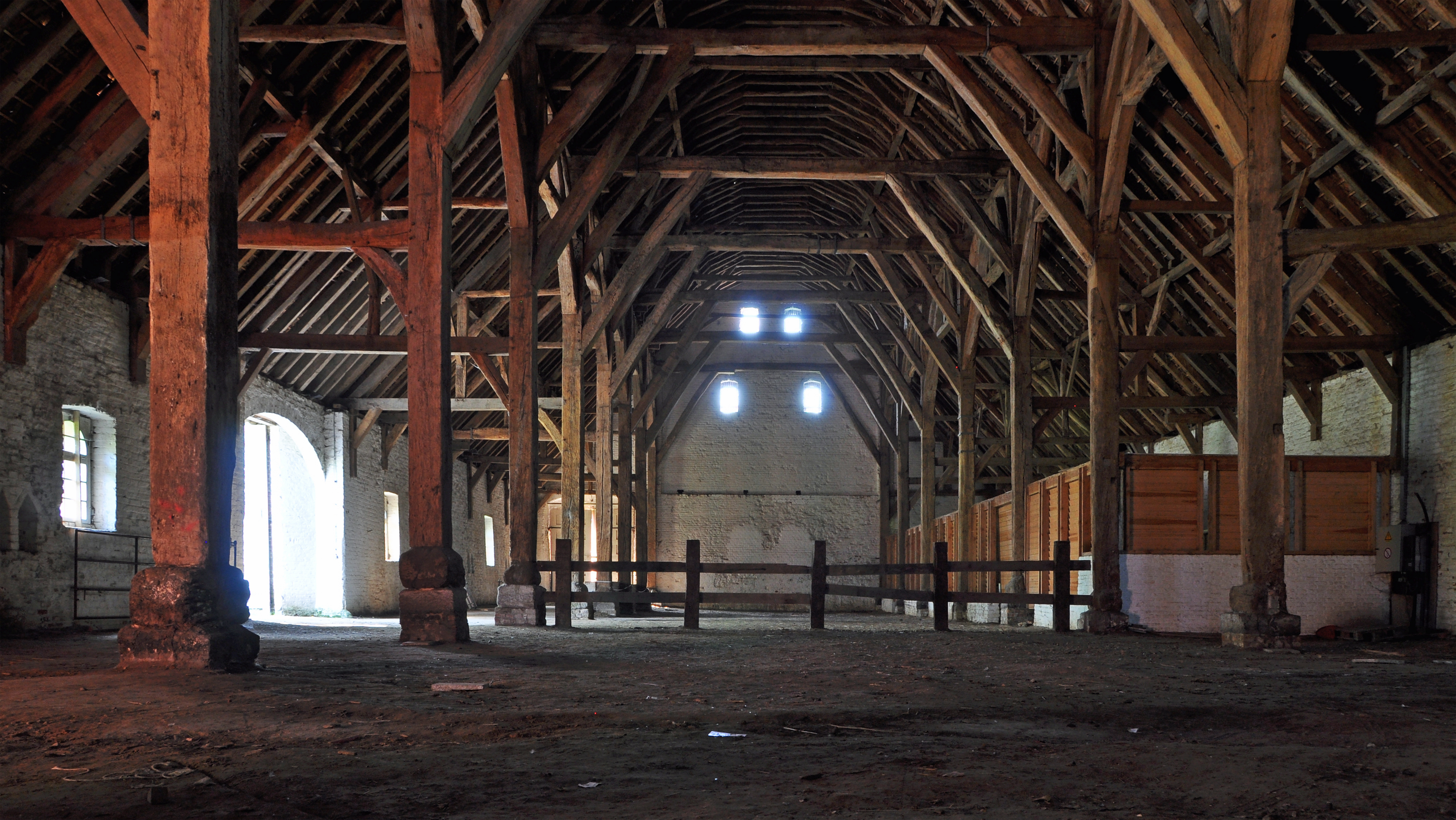
Inside the barn

Almost the only building to survive is the tithe barn, 50 metres long and over 30 metres high, built in 1250.

The abbey once had a vast church with three aisles, which was destroyed in 1571 by the Calvinists. The church stood close to the abbey farm, 't Groot Ter Doest, built in 1632, which still stands, as do an octagonal chapel of 1687 and a monumental porch of 1662.

== Abbots ==
The list of the abbots of Ter Doest:

- 1174–1179: Desiderius Haket
- 1179–1190: Jan van Brugge
- 1190–1204: Mattheus van Gent
- 1204–1213: Willem van Oostburg
- 1213–1219: Daniël van Brugge
- 1219–1226: Salomon van Gent
- 1226–1230: Willem II van Tielt
- 1230–1237: Christiaan van Ieper
- 1237–1239: Willem II van Tielt
- 1239–1243: Hendrik van Craeywyc
- 1243–1256: Jan II Smedekin
- 1256–1274: Nicolaas Cleywaert
- 1274–1279: Jan III Stefaan
- 1279–1285: Willem III van Hemme
- 1285–1300: Arnulfus Neyhensis
- 1300–1302: Willem IV Mostaert
- 1302–1316: Willem V Cordewaegen
- 1316–1329: Nicolaas II Layenweerd
- 1329–1334: Hendrik II van Brabant
- 1334–1338: Petrus I van Axel
- 1338–1363: Michiel de Keysere
- 1363–1385: Willem IV De Smidt
- 1385–1417: Jan IV van Hulst
- 1417–1426: Thomas Vindevoet
- 1426–1461: Jacobus Schaep
- 1461–1482: Laurens De Vriendt
- 1482–1492: Hendrik III Keddekin
- 1492–1501: Martinus Weyts
- 1501–1506: Adriaan Lanchals
- 1506–1512: Jan V Vettegrave
- 1514- ? : Willem VII Pieters
- ?-1525: Josse Arents
- 1525–1536: Gilles van der Elst
- 1536–1537: Jan VI Huyssens
- 1537–1551: Petrus II Van den Driessche
- 1551–1556: Jan VII van Marissiën
- 1556–1559: Antonius Brakele
- 1559–1569: Vincent Doens

== Notable monks ==
- Jan van He, theologian
- Johannes de Pascuis, theologian

== Bibliography ==
- Heirman/Van Santvoort, 2000: Le guide de l'architecture en Belgique (p. 90). Editions Racine: Brussels ISBN 2-87386-236-X
