= Ten Duinen Abbey =

Abbey of the Dunes
- Abdij Ten Duinen
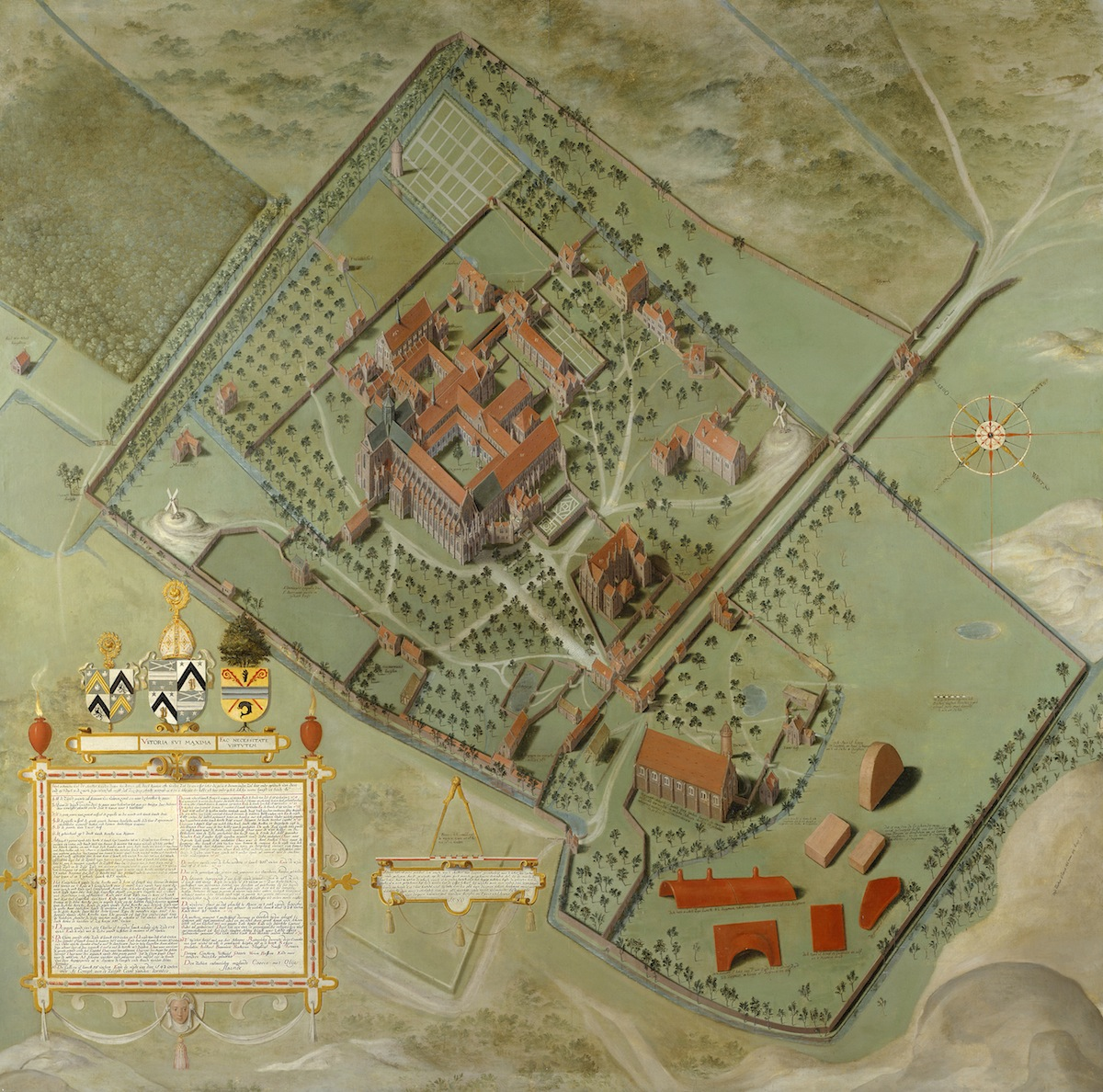
- Pieter Pourbus, Ten Duinen Abbey (1571)
- Interactive map of Abbey of the Dunes

Monastery information
- Order: Cistercians
- Established: 1107
- Disestablished: 1796
- Diocese: Thérouanne (to 1559); Ypres (from 1559); Bruges (from 1627)

Architecture
- Functional status: Bruges seminary
- Heritage designation: listed built heritage
- Designated date: 2009
- Groundbreaking: 1627
- Completion date: 1788

Site
- Coordinates: 51.1096°N 2.6319°E

Ten Duinen Abbey or the Abbey of the Dunes (Dutch: Abdij Ten Duinen) was a Cistercian monastery at Koksijde in what is now Belgium. It was one of the richest and most influential religious institutions in the medieval County of Flanders. It later relocated from Koksijde to the city of Bruges.

== History ==
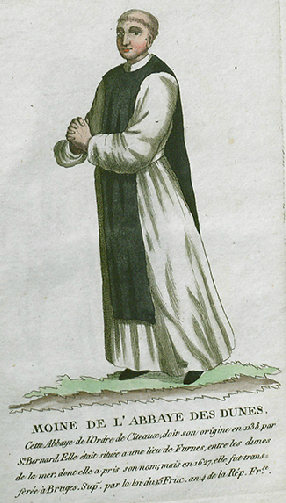
The habit worn by the monks in the 18th century, from a series on monastic costumes by Philippe Joseph Maillart and Jeanne Catherine Maillart

A religious community was founded in the dunes near Koksijde by the hermit Ligerius in 1107. In 1120 the community took the Rule of St Benedict as its rule of life, and in 1139 it became affiliated to the Cistercian Order. Partly through donations and partly through land reclamation work in the dunes and polders, the monastery developed extensive landholdings on which the lay brothers reared sheep, producing wool for the cloth trade. A dependent house was established at Eastchurch, in Kent, to export wool from England, but was later sold to Boxley Abbey. The daughter house Ter Doest Abbey was founded in 1175 and also became rich and influential.

New buildings were begun in 1214 and completed in 1237, to house a community of approximately 400 monks and lay brothers. The new church was consecrated by the bishops of Thérouanne and Tournai on 13 October 1262.

The church was vandalised by Protestant iconoclasts in 1566, and the monastery was sacked by Calvinist rebel forces in 1578. The community was scattered but regrouped in 1583. After decades in temporary accommodation the community was established in Bruges in 1627, in a house that had been the refugium of Ter Doest, which had been re-amalgamated to Ten Duinen in 1624. New monastery buildings (51.218°N 3.231°E) were erected in Bruges in the years 1628–1642. Work on a new church was begun in 1775 and completed in 1788.

On 9 April 1796, during the French occupation of Belgium, the abbey was suppressed and its goods confiscated. In 1833 the diocesan seminary of Bruges was established in the former monastic buildings in Bruges. Excavations of the ruins of the medieval buildings in the dunes near Koksijde began in 1897. Several campaigns have been undertaken since, most notably in 1955 and in 1987–88. The ruins are now a museum site.

== Abbots ==
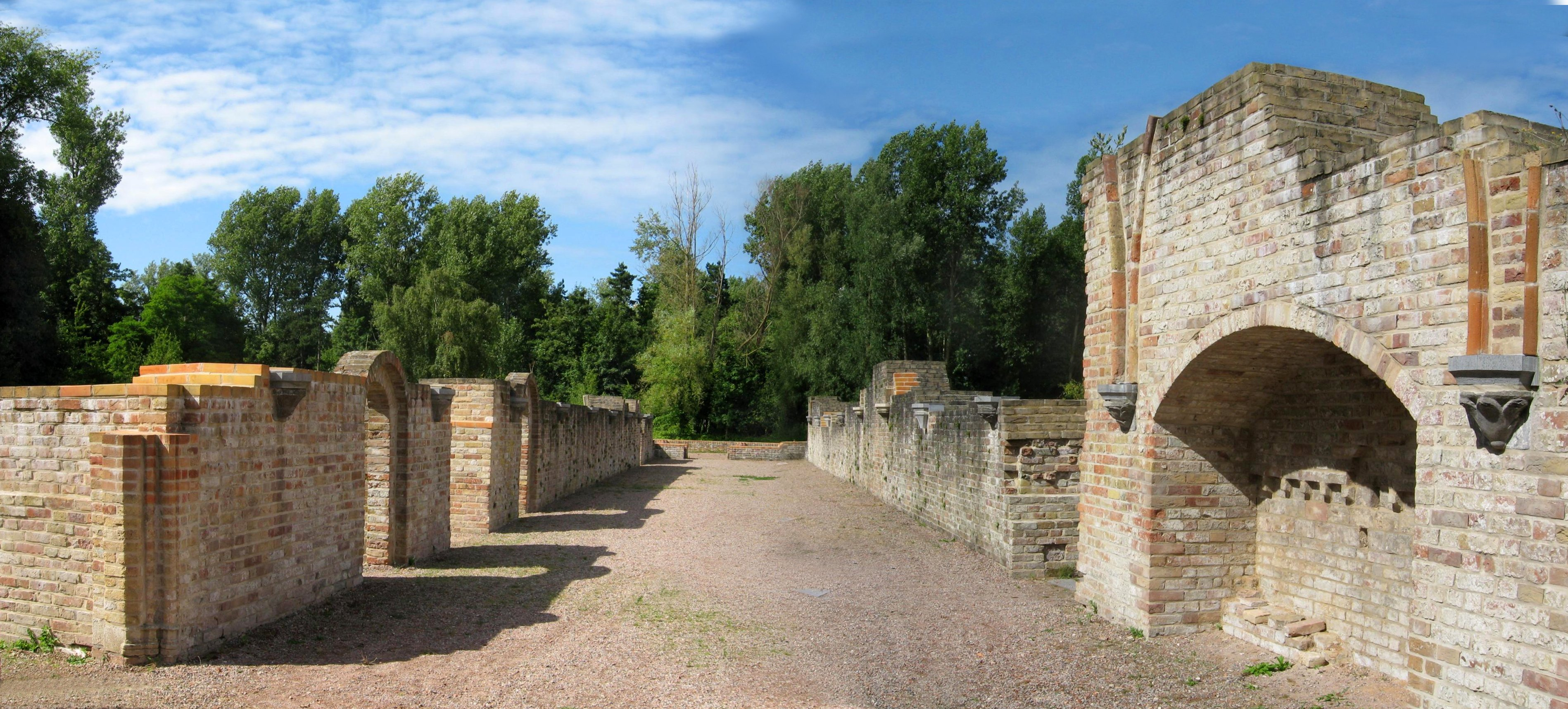
The ruins of the medieval abbey buildings in Koksijde

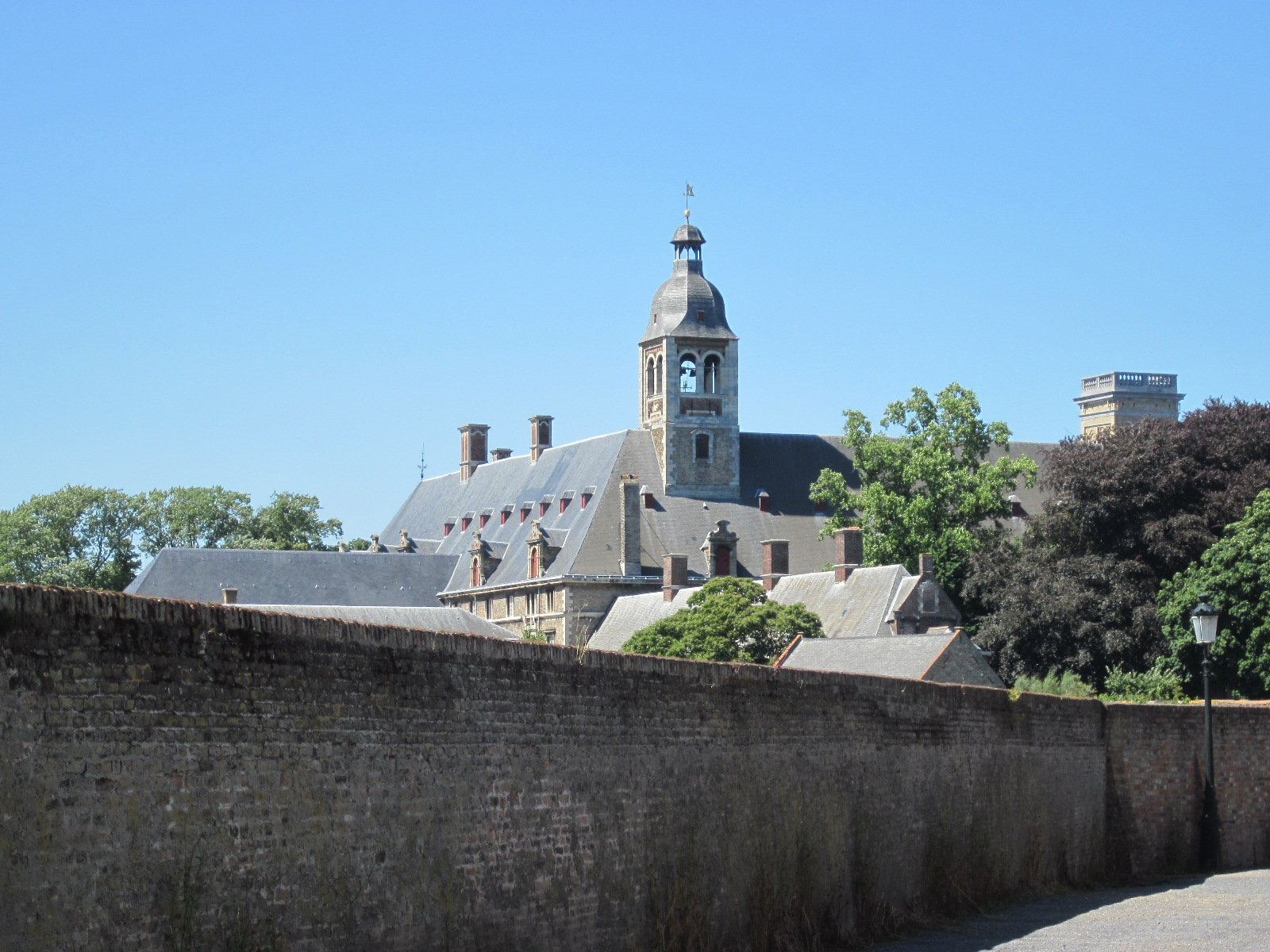
The 17th-century abbey buildings in Bruges

- Fulco, 1128–1138
- Robert of Bruges, 1138–1153
- Albero, 1153–1155
- Idesbald, 1155–1167
- Walter van Dickebusch, 1167–1179
- Hacket, 1179–1185
- Walter van Dickebusch, 1185–1189
- Elias of Koksijde, 1189–1203
- Petrus, 1203–1215
- Amelius, 1215–1221
- Gilles de Steene, 1221–1226
- Solomon of Ghent, 1226–1232
- Nicolas van Belle, 1232–1253
- Lambert van Kemmele, 1253–1259
- Diederik of Brabant, 1259–1265
- Thomas of Ghent, 1265–1277
- Willem Cucht, 1277–1280
- Johannes of Oostburg, 1280–1299
- Jacobus of Biervliet, 1299–1303
- Thomas of Aardenburg, 1303–1305
- William of Hulst, 1305–1318
- Lambert Uppenbrouck of Westouter, 1318–1354
- Walter Bredereep of Kaprijke, 1354–1376
- Jan Maes of Bassevelde, 1376–1406
- Thomas de Corenbytere of Kaprijke, 1406–1418
- Peter van der Marct of Hontenesse, 1418–1442
- Everard van Overtvelt of Bruges, 1442–1457
- Johannes Crabbe, 1457–1488
- Pierre Vaillant of Bruges, 1488–1492
- Josse de Werere of Bruges, 1492–1495
- Christian de Hondt of Bruges, 1495–1509
- Jan Terlinck of Ghent, 1509–1515
- Pieter Onderberch of Ghent, 1515–1519
- Robert le Clercq of Arras, 1519–1559
- Antoine Wydoot of St-Omer, 1559–1566
- Pierre Helline of Axel, 1566–1575
- Robrecht Holman of Sluys, 1575–1579
- Laurent van den Berghe of Ingelmunster, 1579–1583–1606
- André du Chesne of Ath, 1606–1610
- Adrianus Cancellier of Dunkirk, 1610–1623
- Bernard Campmans of Douai, 1623–1642
- Josse du Corron of Ath, 1642–1649
- Bernard Bottyn of Bruges, 1649–1653
- Gerard de Baere of Laarne, 1654–1667
- Michel Bultynck of Tielt, 1667–1678
- Eugeen van de Velde of Bruges, 1678–1680
- Martin Colle of Ypres, 1680–1699
- Lucas De Vriese of Ypres, 1699–1725
- Benedictus van Steenberghe of Ghent, 1725–1729
- Bernard van Thienen of Bruges, 1729–1734
- Antoine De Blende of Bruges, 1734–1744
- Louis de Coninck of Ghent, 1744–1748
- Robert van Severen of Bruges, 1748–1792
- Maur De Mol of Ghent, 1792–1799

== Notable monks ==
- Aegidius de Roya (1415-1478), diplomat and historian
- Jan Sindewint (died 1319), professor of theology at the University of Paris
