= Norbert De Cuyper =

Belgian, Flemish politician

24th Mayor of Torhout
- In office 31 May 1991 – 1 June 2016
- Preceded by: Roger Windels
- Succeeded by: Kristof Audenaert (Acting)

Schepen of culture of Torhout
- In office 3 January 1983 – 31 May 1991
- Succeeded by: Georges Haesaert

Personal details
- Born: 14 April 1943 (age 83) Uitkerke, Belgium
- Party: CD&V
- Spouse: Monique De Zaeyer (m. 1967)
- Children: 2
- Education: Vrij Technisch Instituut (Bruges)

Norbert De Cuyper (born 14 April 1943 in Uitkerke) was a Belgian, Flemish politician, most notably serving as the mayor of the West Flemish city of Torhout from 1991 to 2016.

== Early life ==
Norbert De Cuyper and his fraternal twin brother Hilaire were born on 14 April 1943 in Uitkerke to Gaston De Cuyper and Angèle Van Eeghem. De Cuyper had a younger and older brother asides from his fraternal twin brother, and two younger sisters. De Cuyper studied printing in Bruges and worked at Drukkerij André De Jonghe in Gistel until he erected his own printing shop in Torhout in 1968. The year before, on 1 April 1967, De Cuyper married Monique De Zaeyer and the couple moved to Torhout in order to run a gas station together directly following their marriage. The couple went on to have a son and a daughter who were born in 1968 and 1970 respectively, before the family moved to Wijnendale in 1973.

== Political career ==
Norbert De Cuyper founded the theatre group ’t Fonteintje in 1978, which became a success in Torhout. During the municipal election of 1982 in Torhout, incumbent Senator for the Bruges District and Member of the Flemish Council Roger Windels started a campaign to become the next mayor of Torhout and asked De Cuyper to join his CVP list for the election. De Cuyper initially wanted to turn down the offer, but was convinced to join the list by his father, who himself had served as Schepen and Provincieraadslid in Uitkerke and Blankenberge. On election day, 10 October 1982, De Cuyper was elected after receiving 1,453 preferential votes and all those who would serve as Schepen were decided upon in late November. De Cuyper was sworn in as Schepen of festivities, culture, education and middle class in the council chamber of Torhout City Hall on 3 January 1983. During his first legislature as schepen of Torhout in 1983, he was recorded in the Guinness Book of World Records for the most soup made in one go. After breaking the record together with the town on the Markt of Torhout, the soup was sold to all onlookers who had gathered at the site.

When the next municipal elections lay in sight in 1988, incumbent mayor Windels considered retiring and suggested to De Cuyper that he should run as the leading candidate of the CVP list in order to succeed him as mayor. De Cuyper declined and both men won re-election with De Cuyper receiving the 2nd most preferential votes only behind mayor Windels. However, in the midst of the legislature on 31 May 1991, Windels resigned and De Cuyper thus became the next mayor of Torhout after being sworn into office by governor Olivier Vanneste. De Cuyper won re-election during the 1994 Belgian local elections, this time as the leading candidate of the CVP list. He was re-elected mayor in the elections of 2000, 2006 and 2012. After serving as mayor for 25 years, De Cuyper stepped down and was succeeded, as agreed following the 2012 election, by incumbent CD&V Flemish minister of Education Hilde Crevits, who was sworn in by governor Carl Decaluwé on 9 May 2016 but would only take office on 1 June. However, as Crevits continued to serve as Education minister, her duties were passed on to Eerste Schepen Kristof Audenaert who became acting-mayor.

== See also ==
- List of mayors of Torhout

Preceded by Roger Windels	Mayor of Torhout; 1991–2016	Succeeded by Kristof Audenaert (Acting)

== Bibliography ==
- Demarest, Patrick (2011). Leve Torhout. Norbert De Cuyper. 20 jaar burgervader (PDF). Apriotief. ISBN 9789081820400.
