= Old Civil Registry =

Historic building in Flanders, Belgium

Coordinates: 51°12′30″N 3°13′39″E

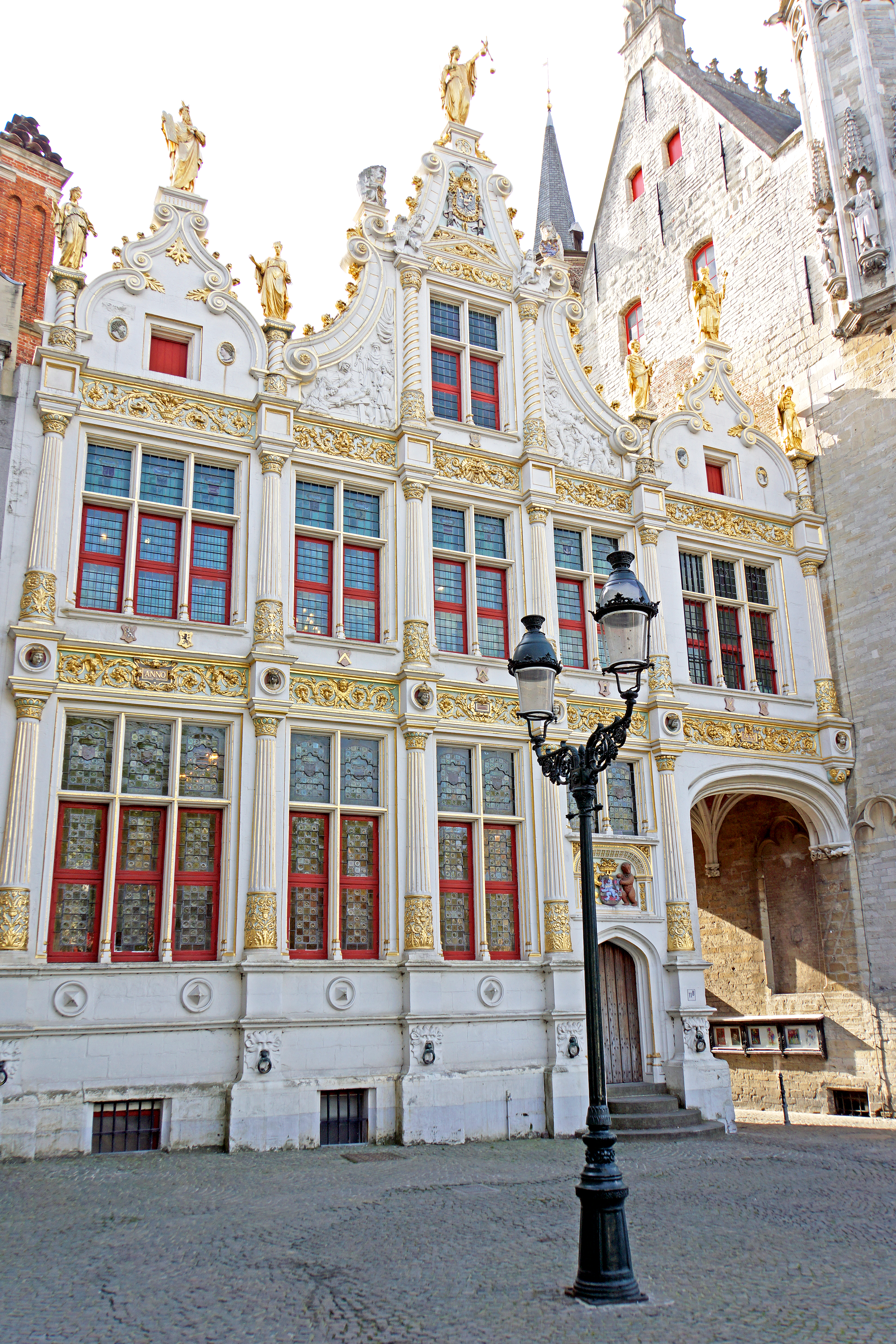
The Old Civil Registry on the Burg Square

The Old Civil Registry (Dutch: Oude Civiele Griffie) is one of the oldest Renaissance buildings in Flanders. It is located on Burg Square in Bruges, between the Manor of the Franc of Bruges and the City Hall.

== History ==
The Civil Registry building was completed in 1537 and housed the Civil Registrar, who was one of the most important city officials. The facade is made entirely from natural stone and is richly decorated with carvings. The bronze statues date from 1883 and are the work of the Bruges sculptor Hendrik Pickery.

The building has been restored three times. The first restoration was carried out between 1877 and 1881, when city architect Louis Delacenserie restored its original 16th century lustre by renewing and adding carvings, decorations and polychromy. In 1980, the facades were pre-hardened and cleaned. Research carried out between 1993 and 1996 then led to a third restoration in 2001. During this final restoration, attempts were made to restore the building's original beautiful colours.

The building has been a protected monument since 1942 and it has been a designated architectural heritage site since September 2009. It is still used by the City Council of Bruges today.
