= Vrije =

Vrije may refer to:

- Vrije Universiteit Amsterdam is a university in Amsterdam, Netherlands
- Vrije Universiteit Brussel is a Flemish university located in Brussels, Belgium
- Brugse Vrije was a castellany in the county of Flanders
- Het Vrije Volk was a Dutch social-democratic daily newspaper
