= Burg, Bruges =

Square in Bruges, Belgium

Burg
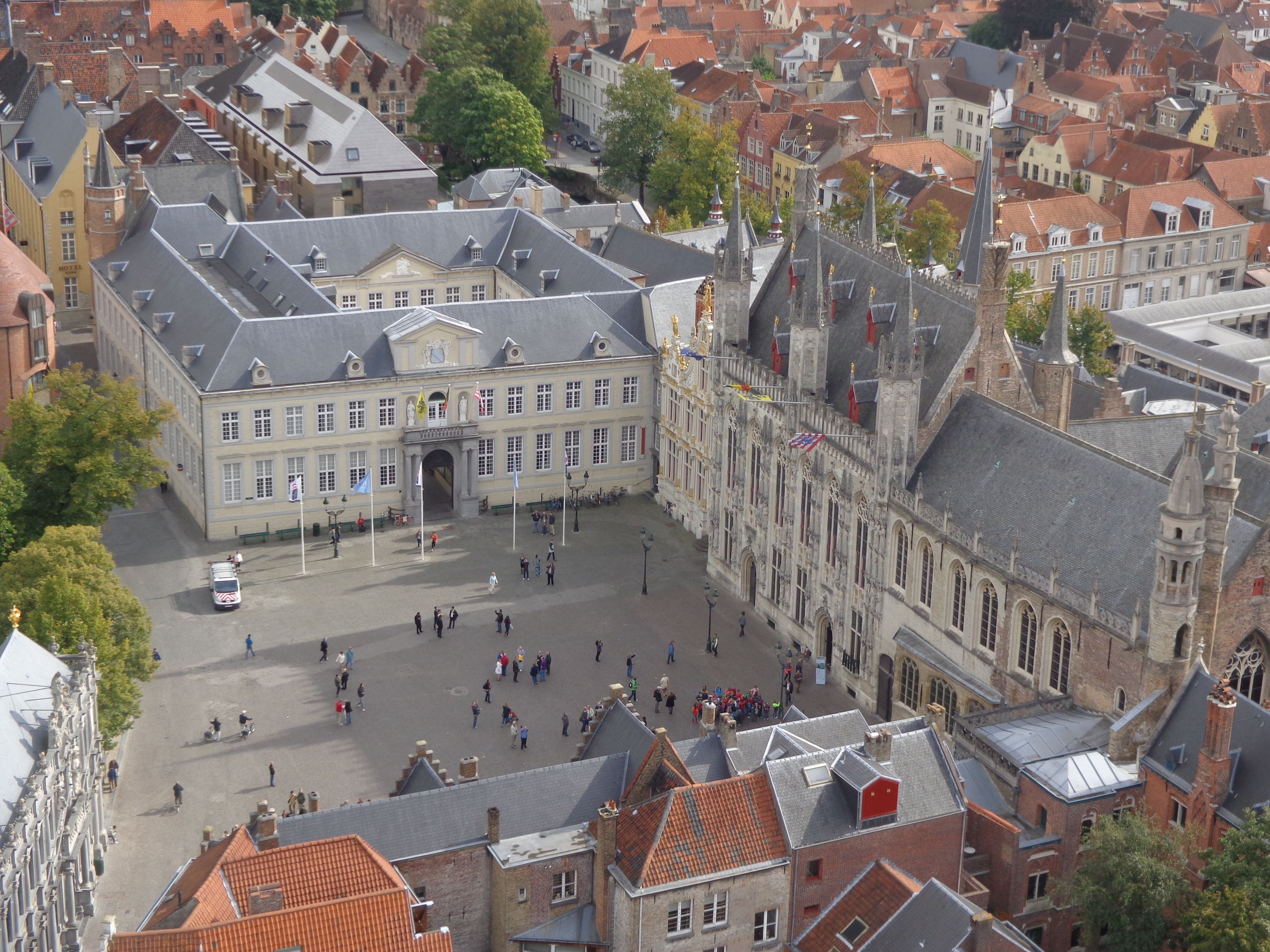
- Aerial view of the Burg from the Belfry

- Location within Belgium
- Location: Bruges, West Flanders, Belgium
- Coordinates: 51°12′31″N 3°13′37″E

The Burg (Middle Dutch for "Fortress") is a square and former fortress in Bruges, West Flanders, Belgium. It is one of the main squares of the city.

== History ==
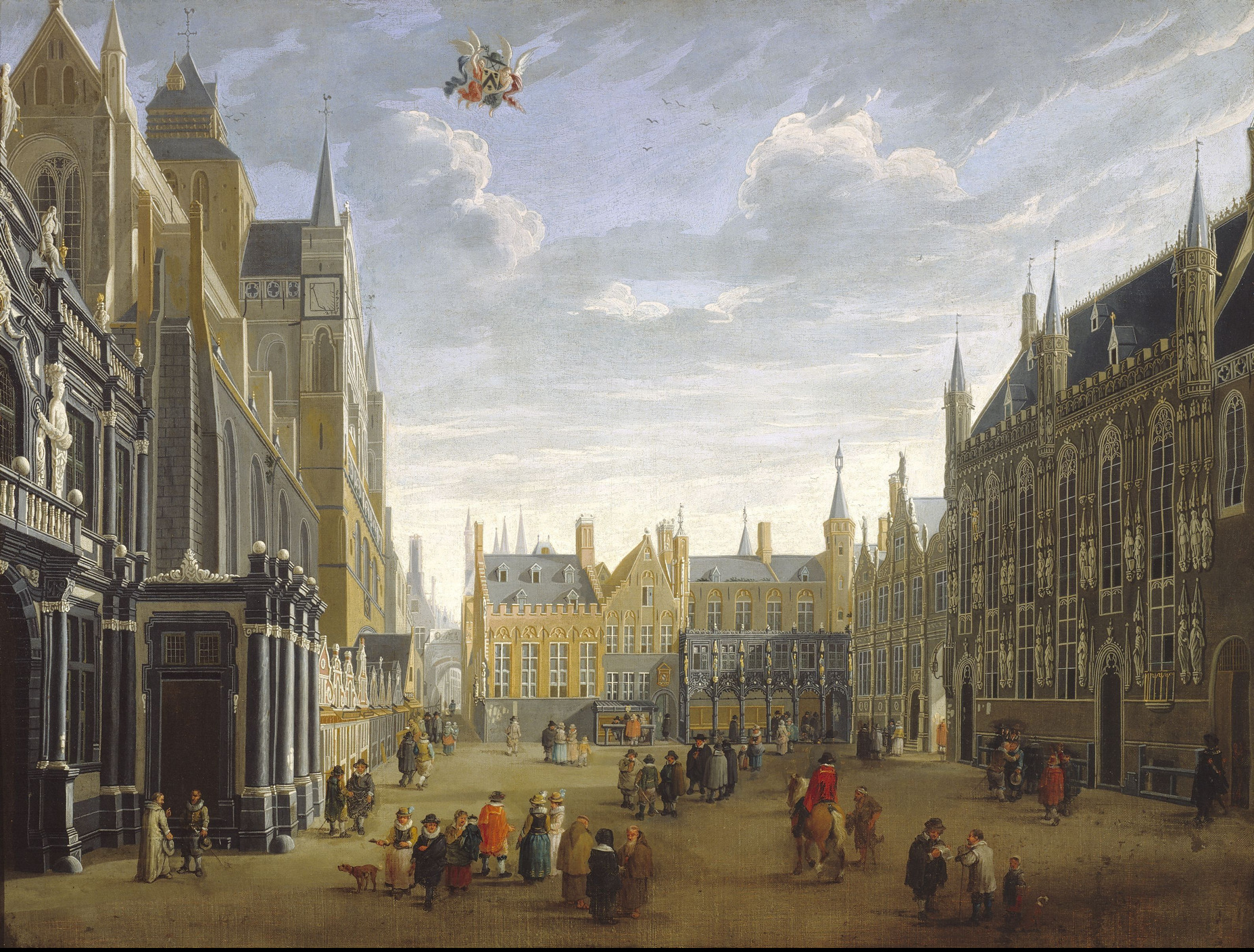
The Burg, painted c. 1691-1700 by Jan Baptist van Meunincxhove, with in the background the manor of the Brugse Vrije and the old civil registry.

The Burg was originally surrounded by walls and had entrance gates. It is one of the oldest parts of the city centre. The fortress was located at the meeting-point of the Oudenburg-Aardenburg Roman road (the Zandstraat) and the Reie canal. The fortress was around one hectare in size. Count Arnulf I of Flanders (889-965) extended the Bruges fortress to create a powerful, imperial administrative centre of one and a half hectares. Steen Castle, which was one of the residences of the Counts of Flanders, was located on the western side of the square from the 11th century until the end of the 13th century. The castle church—which was dedicated to Our Lady and Saint Donatian—was built to the north, within the fortifications, and a chapter of canons was later established. This gave the fortress a dual purpose: the southern part served a civil purpose and the northern part was religious. When Bruges became a diocese in 1559, Saint Donatian’s Church became a cathedral.

The demolition of the cathedral doubled the size of the square to around 1.1 hectares, making it even larger than the arkt. However, it remains divided into two distinct adjoining areas.

== Present Day ==
Nowadays, the square is surrounded by historic buildings including the former Manor of the Franc of Bruges, the former Civil Registry, the City Hall, the Basilica of the Holy Blood and Saint Basil Chapel and the former Provostry of Saint Donatian.

Some of the foundations of Saint Donatian’s Cathedral, which was demolished in 1799, can still be seen in the cellars of the Crowne Plaza Hotel.

There is a short street- the Burgstraat- connecting the Burg and Philipstockstraat.

== See also ==
- Het Steen (Brugge)
