= List of mayors of Torhout =

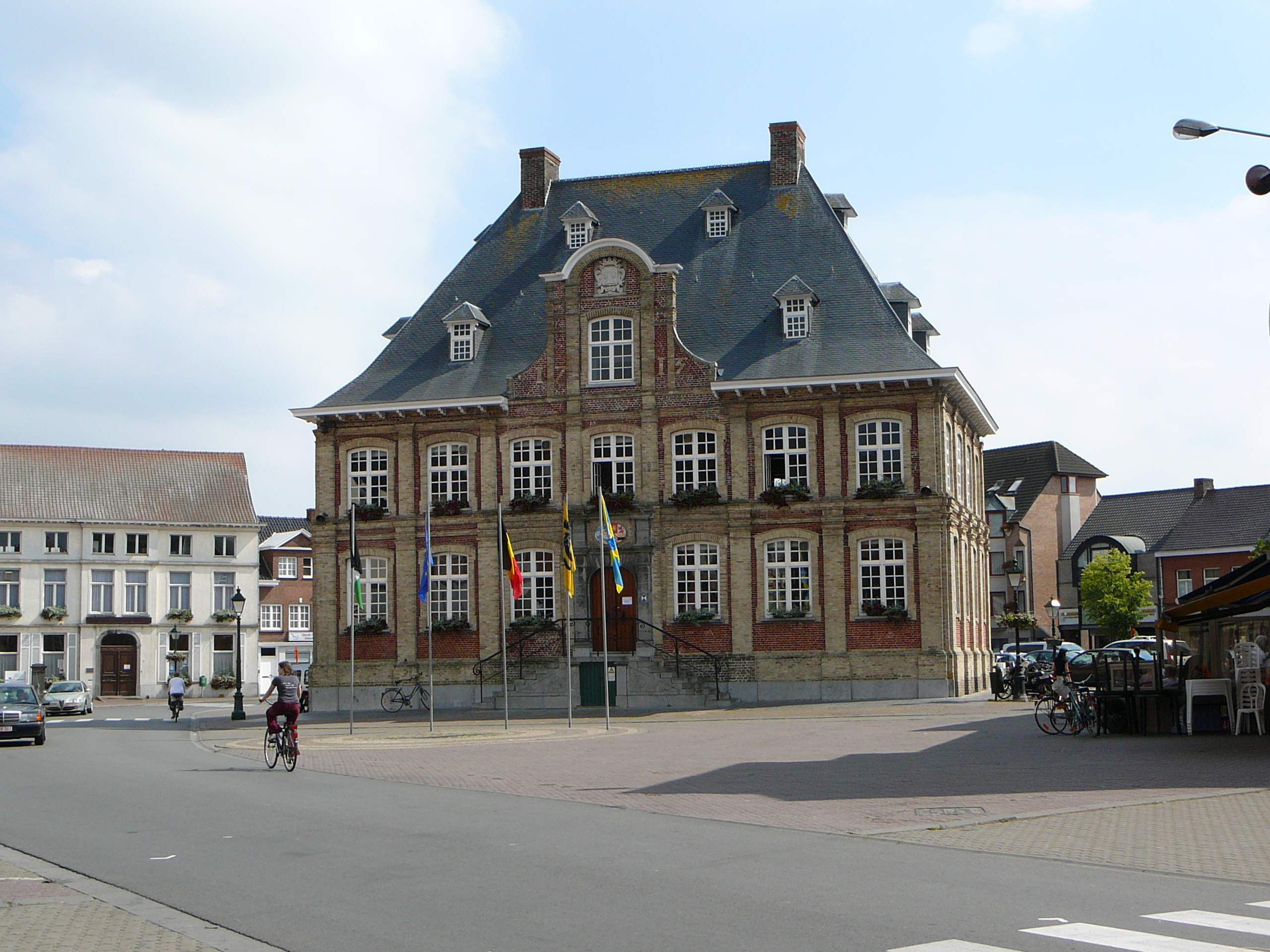
City Hall of Torhout

The following list shows all people who have been Mayor of the Belgian, Flemish city of Torhout in chronological order.

== Mayors of Torhout ==
Name	Service Years	Life Span	Political Party	Notes
Aybert Coutteau				
Pieter Lauwers		(1760-?)		
Joseph Moke	1813-1814			
Jan Baptist Boutens	1814-1823	(1760-1831)		
Charles Lauwers-Serruys	1824-1830	(1765-?)		
Lodewijk Benedict Moke	1830-1847	(1778-1847)		
Auguste Van Caillie	1847-1860	(1801-1867)		
Jan Frans Dieryckx	1860-1873	(1798-1886)		
J. Roets	1873-1885			
Adolphe Claeys	1885-1891	(1849-1902)		
François De Brabandere	1891-1911	(1840-1915)	CVP	
Ernest Bonte	1911-1914	(?-1914)		
Emiel Pattyn	1914	(1860-1915)		Acting Mayor
Clement Meersseman	1914	(1868-1941)		Acting Mayor
Jean Tyberghein	1915-1918			Acting War Mayor
Clement Meersseman	1918-1919	(1868-1941)		
Robert Van Malleghem	1920-1935			
Charles Boone	1935			Acting Mayor
Aimé Becelaere senior	1935-1940	(1874-1942)	CVP	
Urbain Clement	1940	(1884-1960)		Resigned
Albert Leuridan	1941			Resigned
Germain Callens	1941-1944			War Mayor
Urbain Clement	1944	(1884-1960)		Acting Mayor
Charles Boone	1945			Acting Mayor
Edmond Geysens	1945			Acting Mayor
Gustaaf Pollet	1946-1975	(1899-1975)	CVP	Longest Serving Mayor (29 Years)
Aimé Becelaere II	1975-1976	(1907-1996)	CVP	
Carlos Daled	1976-1982	(1937-2012)	Sp.a	
Roger Windels	1982-1991	(1924-1996)	CVP	
Norbert De Cuyper	1991-2016	(1943)	CD&V	
Kristof Audenaert	2016-2018	(1983)	CD&V	Acting Mayor
Hilde Crevits	2016-2018	(1967)	CD&V	Absent due to minister position
Kristof Audenaert	2019	(1983)	CD&V	
