= Windels =

Windels is a surname. Notable people with the surname include:

- Paul Windels (1885–1967), American lawyer and government official
- Roger Windels (1924–1996), Belgian politician
- Sue Windels (born 1946), American politician
