= Provostry of St. Donatian =

Coordinates: 51°12′31″N 3°13′34″E

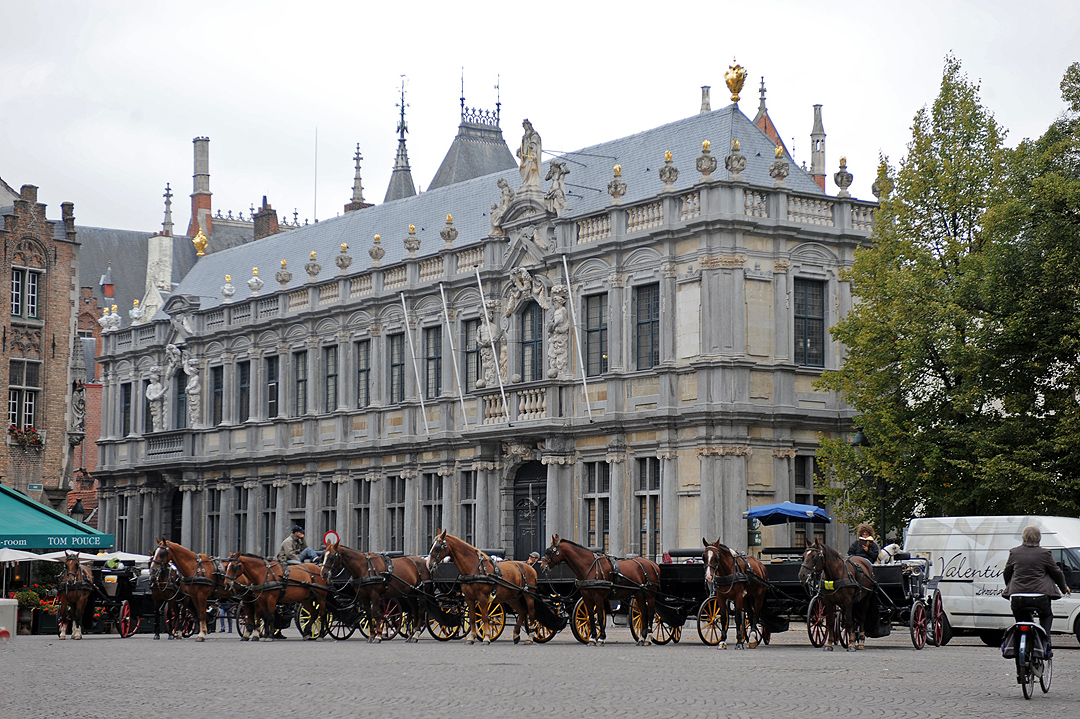
The Provostry of St. Donatian on the Burg square.

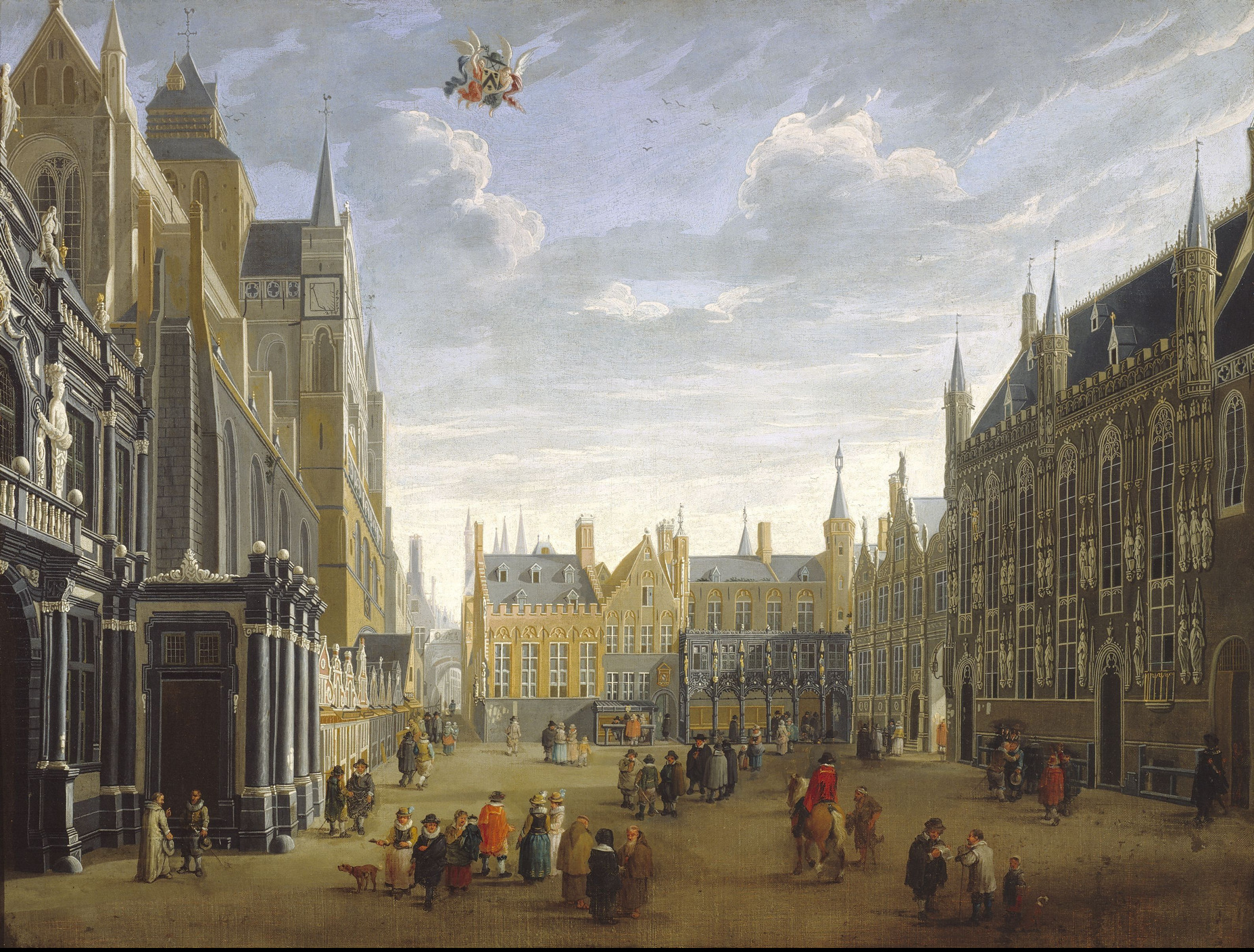
The provostry (on the left) on a painting by Jan Baptist van Meunincxhove from c. 1691–1700.

The Provostry of St. Donatian (Dutch: Sint-Donaasproosdij or Proosdij van de kerkelijke heerlijkheid van Sint-Donaas) is a Baroque building on the Burg Square in Bruges, Belgium. Built in the 17th century, it served as the headquarters of the ecclesiastical seigniory of St. Donatian.

== History ==
In 1089, under the rule of Robert I of Flanders, deans of St. Donatian's Cathedral were also given the role of chancellors of the County of Flanders. In this role, they were not only responsible for the administration of the county but also developed an important ecclesiastical seignory with its own administration and court. In 1560, Bruges for the first time became the seat of a bishopric, with Petrus Curtius as its first bishop. He was also given the role of dean and chancellor, which continued to be held by the 17 successive bishops who would rule the diocese until the end of the 18th century.

The current building dates from 1665 to 1666 and was designed by Antwerp architect Cornelis Verhouven and canon Frederic Hillewerve (also from Antwerp). It was built in the triumphal Baroque style typical of the Counter-Reformation. The pronounced baroque style is typical of 17th-century Antwerp Baroque architecture and is unique in Bruges city centre. The huge door was an entrance way for horses and carriages. Lady Justice can be seen above and the Greek gods of truth, charity and justice can be seen on the top pediment. The elaborate carving is the work was Bruges sculptor Cornelis Gailliaert.

== Extensions and restorations ==
The provostry originally consisted of two storeys and nine bays. In 1865, the right-hand side was extended by the addition of an extra half-bay and a new side wall. This was necessary, as the east wall – which was not meant to be seen – was exposed when St. Donatian's Cathedral was demolished at the beginning of the 19th century. The former provostry was given its current measurements in 1907 when it was extended by the addition of six bays on the left-hand side (towards the Markt) following the demolition of a number of houses.

Architect Luc Dugardyn thoroughly restored the building from 1972 to 1974. The statues were also renewed in Lavaux stone by J. Dekeyzer (Langemark). The provostry was re-decorated again in 2001. It is now part of the official residence of the governor of West Flanders.
