= Jacob van Oost =

Flemish painter (1603–1671)

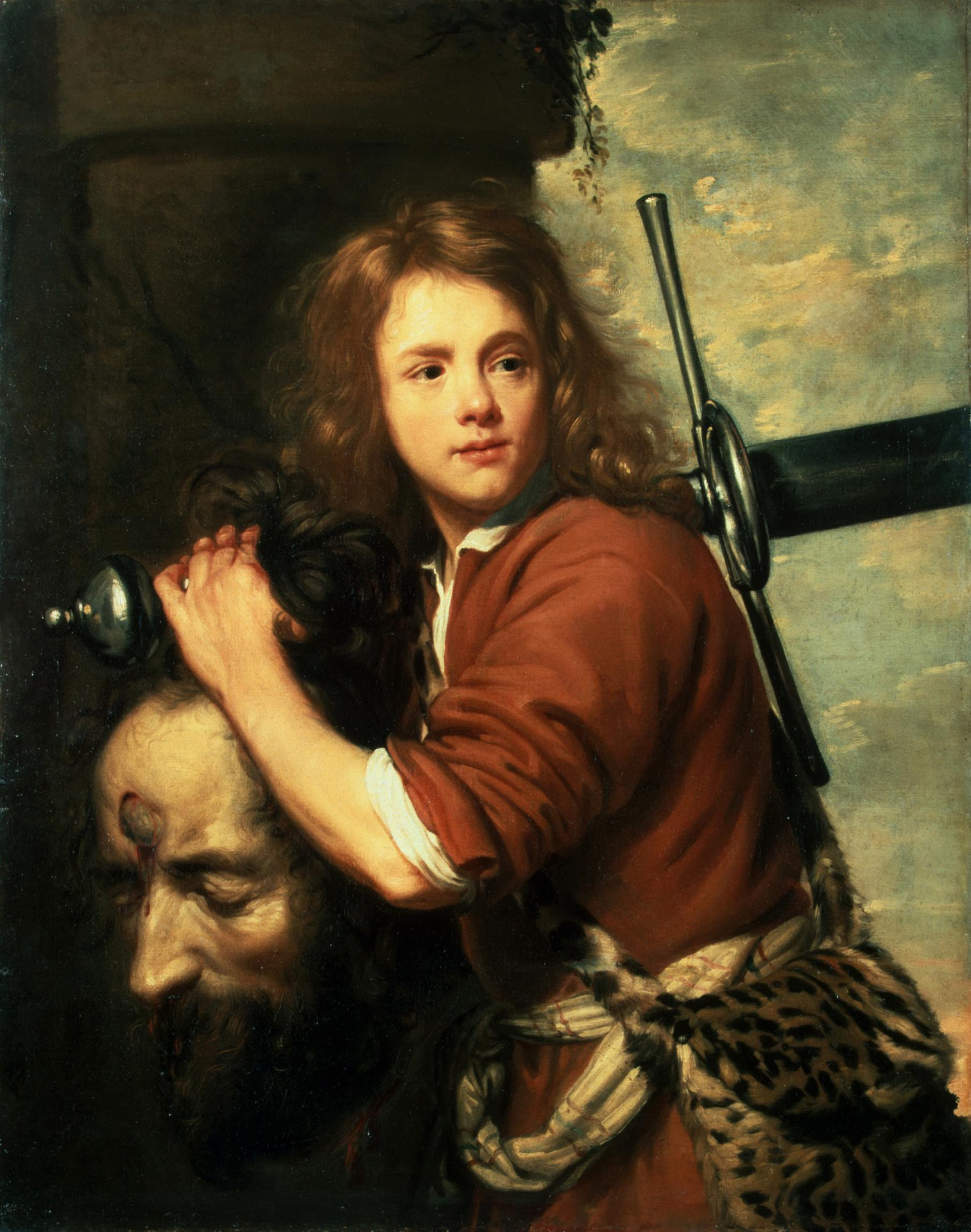
David with the head of Goliath

Jacob van Oost or Jacob van Oost the Elder (1603–1671) was a Flemish painter of history paintings and portraits. He was the most important painter of Bruges in the 17th century through his portraits of members of the local bourgeois and his many altarpieces made in the spirit of the Counter-Reformation. He also created genre paintings of musicians and card players for the open market.

== Life ==
Jacob van Oost was born in Bruges as the son of Johannes van Oost en Gheeraerdyne Weyts. His family was well-off. It is not clear who was his master but he was probably a pupil of his brother Frans van Oost.

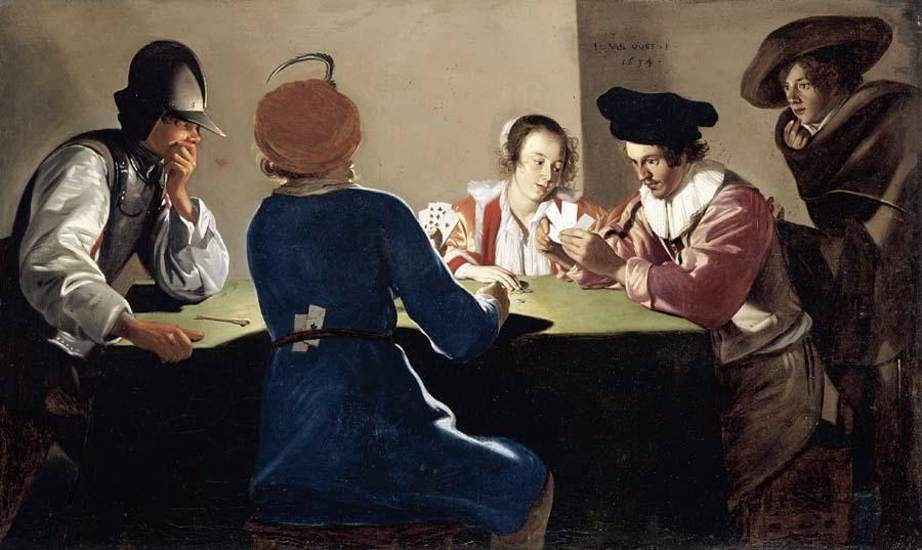
Card players

Jacob van Oost became master of the Bruges Guild of St. Luke in 1621. He left that year for Italy. The work he made during his Italian residence has not been identified. During the five years he spent in Rome he may have studied under Annibale Carracci. After his return to Bruges in 1628 he became a 'stedehouder' (director) of the local Guild of St. Luke on 13 October 1629. He married Jaquemyne Van Overdille in Bruges in 1630. His wife died the next year leaving him one son Maarten. In 1633 Jacob van Oost married Maria van Tollenaere. The couple had six children. His sons Jacob the Younger and Willem became notable painters in their own right. His grandson Dominique Joseph van Oost was a portrait and history painter active in Lille.

Jacob van Oost was commissioned to restore Jan van Eyck's famous Virgin and Child with Canon van der Paele (1436) in the former Church of Saint-Donaas (now in the Groeningemuseum) in Bruges in 1632–33. Between 1633 and 1662 Jacob van Oost held various positions in the Guild of St. Luke including various term as the dean of the Guild. From 1651 until his death he was the official city painter of Bruges.

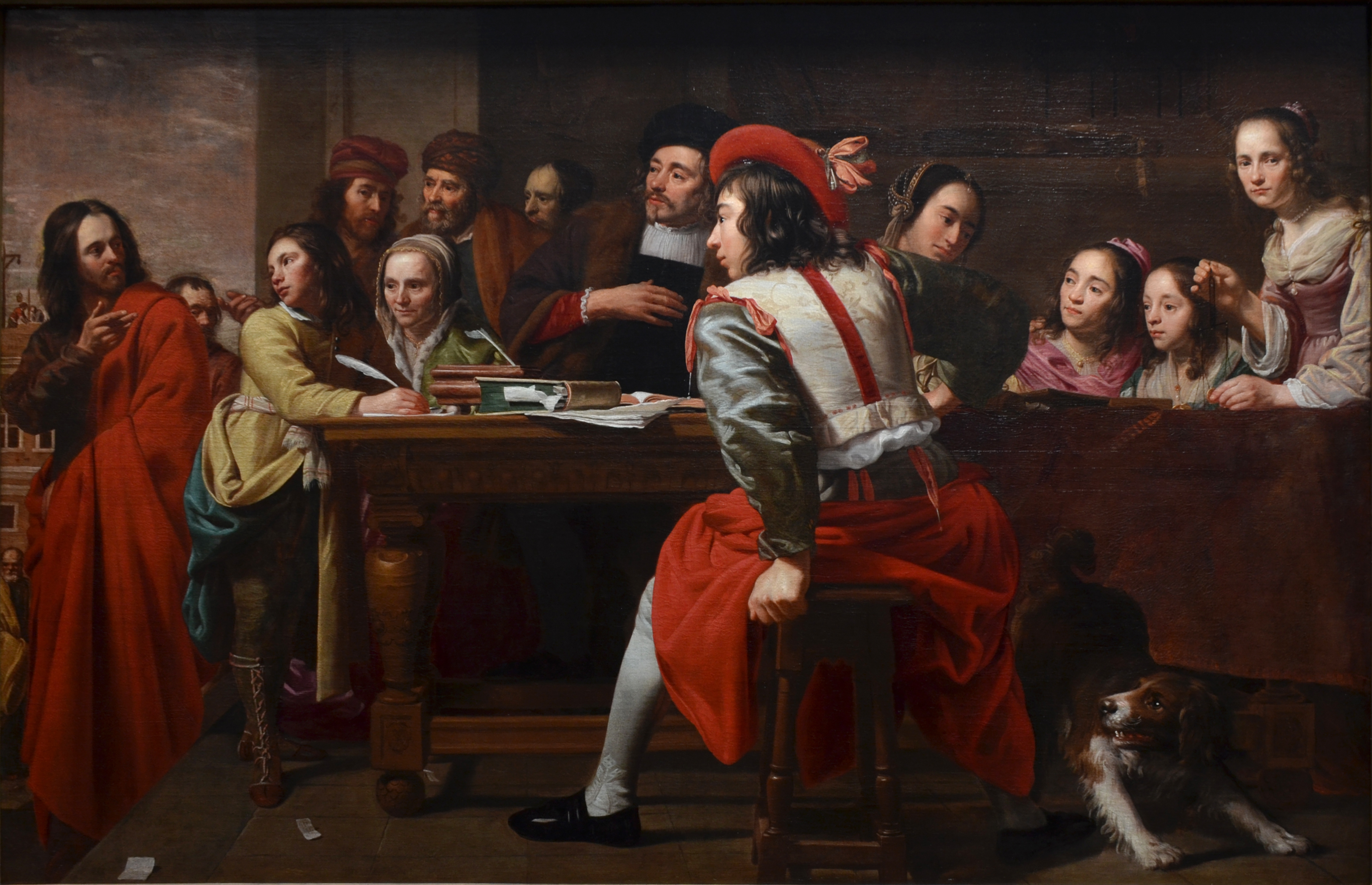
The calling of St Matthew

His registered pupils were his sons Jacob the Younger and Willem, and the painters Boudewijn Bodet, Franschoes Gheilliaert, Jan Maes, Jan Baptist van Meunincxhove, Jan Ramon and Arnoldus de Roose.

Van Oost died in Bruges.

== Work ==
Jacob van Oost was a prolific painter who made portraits for the local bourgeois and history paintings. He is primarily known for the altarpieces in the spirit of the Counter Reformation and his portraits. A small number of paintings, mostly with secular, genre-style themes such as interiors with figures (musical companies, card players, fortune tellers etc.), was likely aimed at private individuals and possibly for the open market. He also made copies after van Dyck and Rubens. Van Oost was the leading 17th-century painter from Bruges.

His work was strongly influenced by early Baroque painters such as Caravaggio and his follower Bartolomeo Manfredi whose work he had studied during his stay in Italy. The influence of Caravaggio can be seen in the chiaroscuro effects as well as the non-idealised figures. An example of this is the 1630 Adoration of the Shepherds (Hermitage Museum). His genre scenes in the 1630s showed the influence of Bartolomeo Manfredi. An example is the Card Players (1634, private collection).

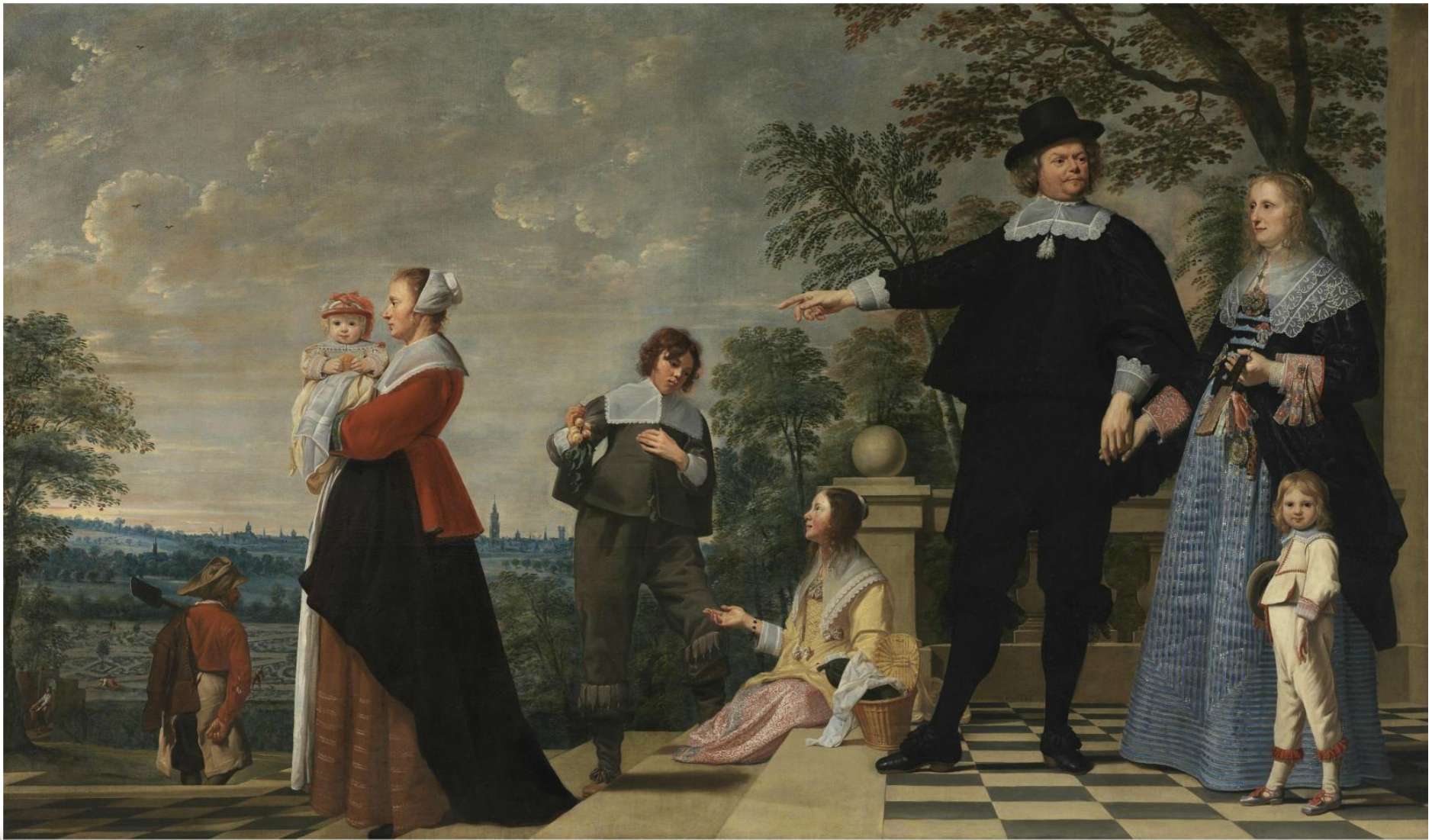
Portrait of a Bruges family

After this early Caravaggesque influence, his work developed towards more monumental figures and a more classicist treatment that reflected the work of Annibale Carracci and his follower Domenichino. From the 1650s, his work started to display greater emotionality, the use of dramatic spatial effects and a palette closer to Venetian art. Van Oost's paintings of that period show the influence of Federico Barocci, Correggio and Anthony van Dyck. A few times he even simply copied van Dyck's compositions. While this stylistic development was quite common among contemporary Flemish artists, the clear structure and strong modelling of van Oost's work make his manner distinctive.

While his portraits are generally rather formulaic the Portrait of a Bruges Family (1645, Groeningemuseum, Bruges) reveals a careful composition. Through its emblematic and monumental character it can be regarded as a masterpiece of high Baroque painting.

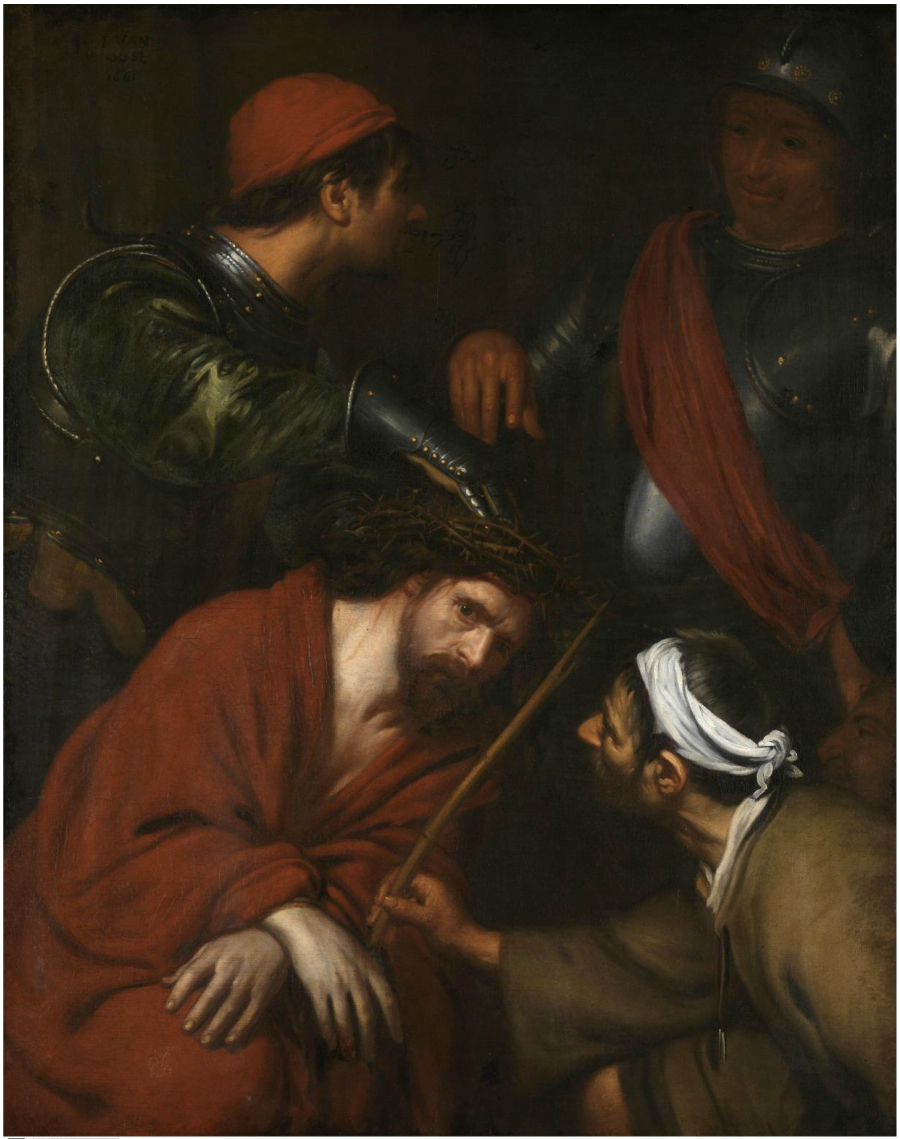
Christ crowned with thorns. c. 1661

Many of his religious works can still be seen in the churches of Bruges. The St. Salvator's Cathedral in Bruges holds 13 paintings by Jacob Van Oost, which can be viewed in situ throughout the church. His paintings can also be seen in museums throughout the world including the Gemäldegalerie, Berlin, the Groeningemuseum in Bruges, the National Gallery in London, the Louvre in Paris, the Philadelphia Museum of Art and the Hermitage in St Petersburg.

Portrait of a Theologue and his Secretary. Musea Brugge - Groeningemuseum. c. 1668
