= Het Steen, Bruges =

Coordinates: 51.208484°N 3.22627°E

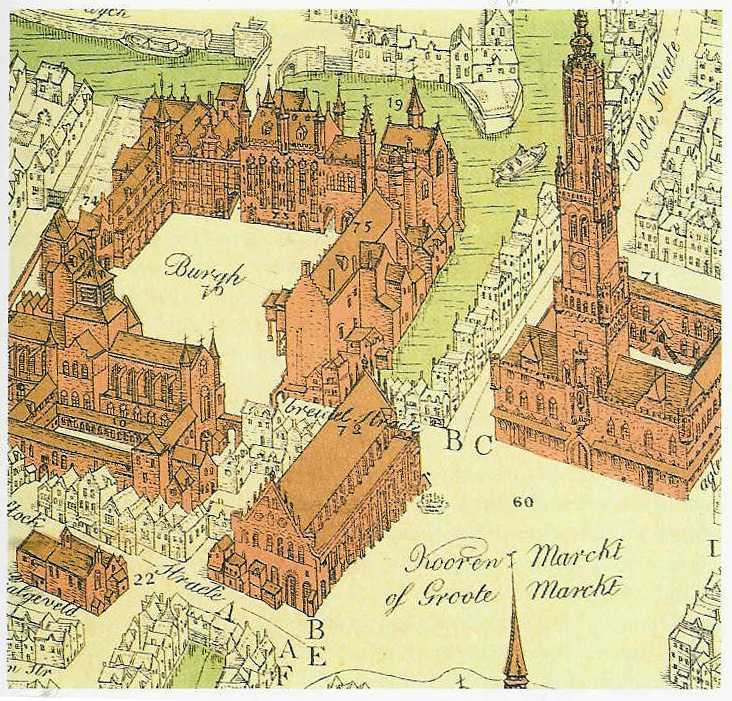
Steen Castle on the map of Marcus Gerards (1562). The structure is indicated by number 75.

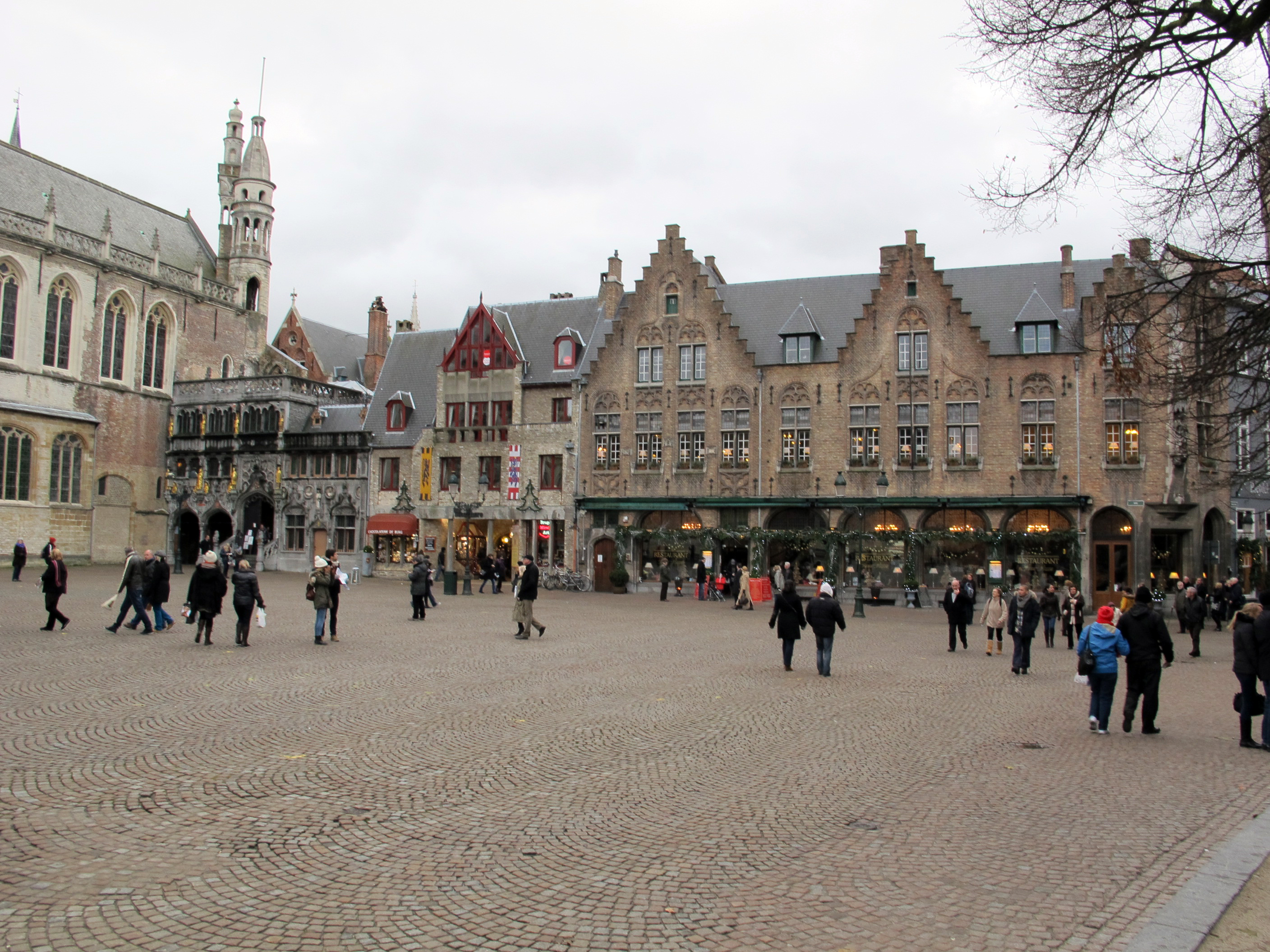
The location of the former Steen Castle on the Burg Square

Het Steen was a medieval building on the Burg Square in Bruges, Belgium. Between the late 11th and late 13th centuries, it served as the residence of the Counts of Flanders.

== History ==
It is not clear whether the building was a successor to the Oude Steen, which is on Wollestraat – in the oldest part of the city – and which has cornerstones dating back to the 11th or 12th century.

Steen Castle may also date from that period, but little is known about its early history. It is likely that it was built to replace a wooden structure. According to historians, the first stone building - a keep - was built between 863 and 965 by Count Baldwin I, Count Baldwin II or Count Arnulf I. Another historian has dated the building to the reign of Count Baldwin V (1035 – 1067).

The first definite date that can be given to the building is 1088, when the building was listed as ‘lapidis domus comitis’. Galbert of Bruges’ story about the murder of Charles the Good also mentions Steen Castle as the residence of the Count. It is said that one of his successors abandoned the building in the 12th century and chose to stay in the Love on the opposite side of Burg Square when he was visiting Bruges. From the end of the 12th century, Steen Castle was used as a count's prison.

At the end of the 13th century, the Count also left the Love and granted the city the right to use a number of buildings around Bruges which he owned. Steen Castle became the city prison. In 1689, the building was largely destroyed by a fire and the Raephuis on the Pandreitje was established as the new prison.

In 1751, the city acquired full ownership of Steen Castle. It was still badly damaged by the fire and the city took the decision to demolish the dilapidated building in 1784–85. The plot remained undeveloped until the middle of the 19th century, when the city sold the land and a building and workshop was established there by the ironmonger Joseph De Jaegher. This building was demolished in 1955 and replaced by a neoclassical building with three floors and four bays. In 1977, this building was also demolished, to be replaced by a building with a shopping gallery – Ten Steeghere – which led to Wollestraat. Next to this, there was a 19th-century neo-Gothic commercial building which still remains in place. This building, which was known as In de Kapelle, was rebuilt in 1931, adding three stepped gables in the neo-Gothic style. Nowadays the building houses Brasserie Tompouce.
