= Olivier Vanneste =

Belgian politician and economist

Governor of West Flanders
- In office September 1979 – 1997
- Preceded by: Leo Vanackere
- Succeeded by: Paul Breyne

Personal details
- Born: 18 May 1930; Kortrijk, West Flanders, Belgium
- Died: 18 September 2014 (aged 84); Bruges, Belgium
- Political party: CVP
- Profession: Economist; Politician

Olivier Paul Jules, Baron Vanneste (18 May 1930 – 18 September 2014) was a Belgian politician and economist. A member of the CD&V (formerly known as the Christian People's Party, CVP, until 2001), Vanneste served as the Governor of West Flanders from 1979 until 1997.

Vanneste, an economist, was born in Kortrijk, Belgium. In 1954, he published his book, Structurele Werkloosheid in West-Vlaanderen, which was later utilized an outline for economic development in West Flanders. Vanneste served as the founder and managing director of both the West-Vlaamse Economische Raad and the West-Vlaams Economisch Studiebureau.

He served as the Governor of West Flanders from 1979 to 1997.

Vanneste stepped down as governor in 1997. Following his retirement from public office, he served as a director of several business and organizations, including KBC Bank, the Port of Bruges-Zeebrugge, and the Katholieke Universiteit Leuven (KU Leuven). In 2001, Vanneste was raised into the Belgian nobility by King Albert II and given the noble title Baron for life.

Olivier Vanneste died on 18 September 2014 in Bruges at the age of 84.

Political offices
Preceded by Leo Vanackere	Governor of West Flanders; 1979–1997	Succeeded by Paul Breyne
