= Governor of West Flanders =

The Governor of West Flanders is the head of government for the Belgian province of West Flanders. The province is located in the Flemish Region of Belgium.

== Governor (1815-1830) ==
Provincial governors of West Flanders under the United Kingdom of the Netherlands (1815-1830).

- 1815 - 1821: Joseph Benoît de Loën d'Enschede
- 1821 - 1822: Hyacinthe van der Fosse
- 1822 - 1826: Benedictus Josephus Holvoet
- 1826 - 1830: Ferdinand de Baillet

== Governors of West Flanders (1830 – Present) ==
A list of governors since Belgian independence in 1830.

#	Governor	Party	Office entered	Office left
1.	Felix de Muelenaere	Catholic	1830	1831
1.	Felix de Muelenaere	Catholic	1832	1834
1.	Felix de Muelenaere	Catholic	1836	1849
2.	Adolphe de Vrière	Liberal	1849	1857
3.	Benoît Vrambout		1857	1877
4.	Léon Ruzette		1877	1878
5.	Theodore Heyvaert		1878	1883
6.	Guillaume De Brouwer		1883	1884
7.	Léon Ruzette		1884	1901
8.	Jean-Baptiste de Bethune		1901	
9.	Charles d'Ursel		1901	1903
10.	Jean-Baptiste de Bethune		1903	1907
11.	Albéric Ruzette		1907	1912
12.	Léon Janssens de Bisthoven		1912	1933
13.	Henri Baels		1933	1940
14.	Michel Bulckaert		1940	1944
15.	Pierre van Outryve d'Ydewalle		1944	1979
16.	Leo Vanackere	CVP	1979	
17.	Olivier Vanneste	CVP	1979	1997
18.	Paul Breyne	CVP/CD&V	1997	2012
19.	Carl Decaluwé	CD&V	2012	2026
20.	Jurgen Vanlerberghe	Vooruit	2026	present
