= Bruges City Hall =

City hall in Bruges, Belgium

Coordinates: 51.2081°N 3.2269°E

- Stadhuis van Brugge (Dutch)
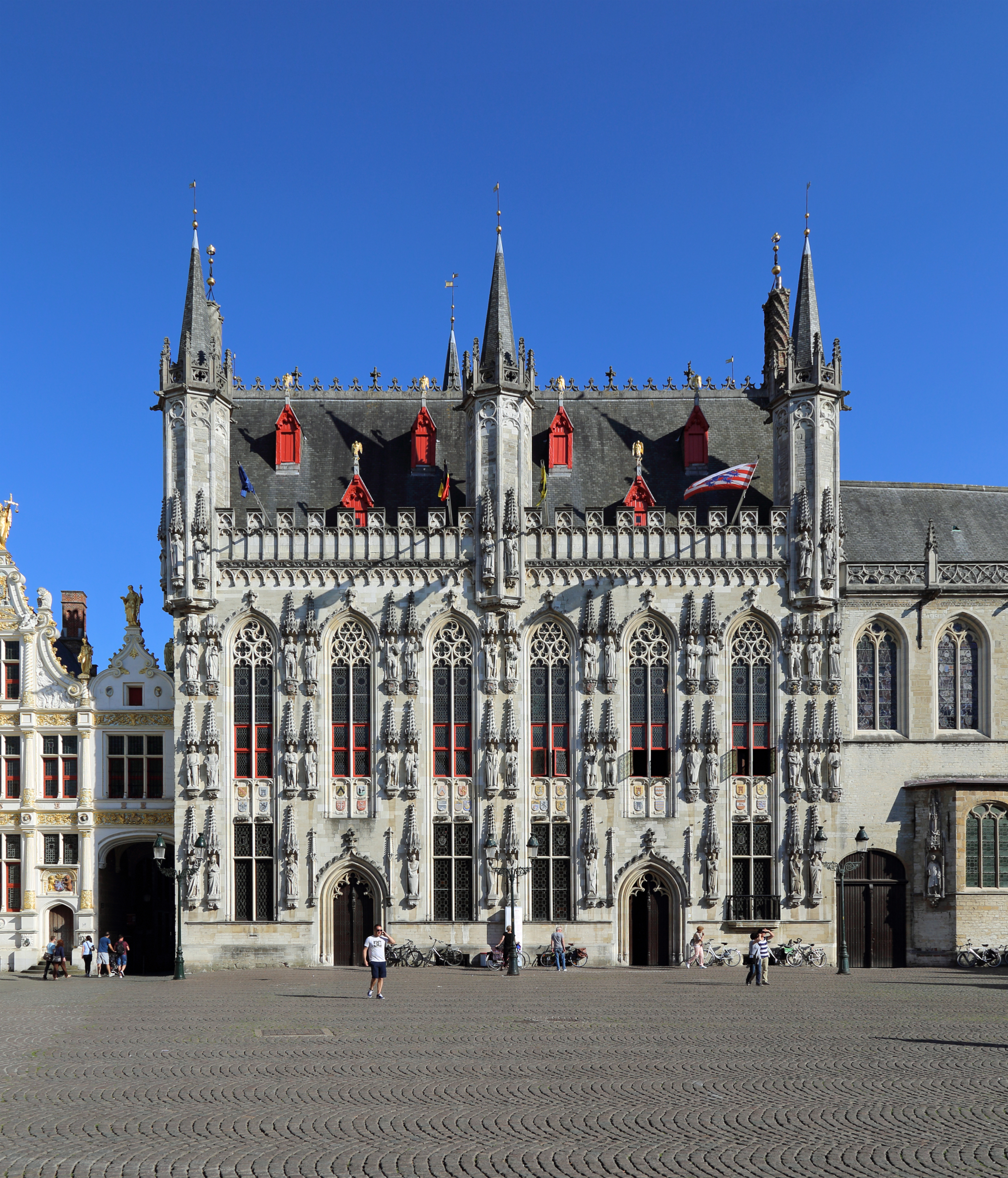
- Bruges' City Hall seen from the Burg Square
- Interactive map of the Bruges City Hall area

General information
- Architectural style: Late Gothic
- Location: Bruges, Belgium
- Construction started: 1376
- Completed: 1421 (original completion)

Design and construction
- Architects: Unknown (probably Jan Roegiers; also possible: Jan van Rijssele or Mathieu Saghen); Louis Delacenserie (restoration 1895–1905); Jean-Baptiste Bethune (restoration 1895–1905)
- Engineer: Jan Roegiers (1376–1421 construction phase)

The City Hall (Dutch: Stadhuis) of Bruges, West Flanders, Belgium, is a landmark building and the seat of that city. Built in a late-Gothic monumental style between 1376 and 1421, it is one of the oldest city halls in the former Burgundian Netherlands. It is located on Burg Square, the area of the former fortified castle in the centre of Bruges.

== History ==
=== Early history ===
After a fire in the city's Belfry in 1280, the old Ghyselhuus, which had already fallen into disuse as the jail of the Count of Flanders, was still the meeting place for the city council. In 1376, the Ghyselhuus was pulled down and replaced by a new purpose built council building. Count Louis laid the foundation stone. Responsibility for its construction was given to Jan Roegiers, and the project was completed late in 1421. The City Hall is the earliest late-Gothic monumental-style municipal council building in Flanders or Brabant: its flamboyant opulence testifies to the city's economic and political power at a time when the population of Bruges is believed to have reached more than 37,000, or even 45,000 people.

The pioneering stone facade of the oldest part, which during the 16th and 17th centuries was several times extended towards the south, inspired in quick succession the city halls of Brussels, Ghent, Leuven and Oudenaarde. The building's admirers highlight the effect of the "Brugian span", referring to the abundance of repeating systematically positioned niches encompassing the windows, though it is not clear that this effect was invented in Bruges.

The statues under the stone baldachin-canopies on the building's facade have been renewed several times. At the time of the French Revolution, all the statues were destroyed. A small number of genuine pieces are now included in the collections of the city museum. The crenellated facade is topped off with little turrets and the roof is decorated with its own little crests and dormers. In 1766, the door on the left side of the building's facade was repositioned to make the overall effect more symmetrical.

=== Later restoration ===
Between 1895 and 1905, the distinguished local architect Louis Delacenserie and the neo-Gothic architect Jean-Baptiste Bethune started the restoration of the interior. The lesser and greater council chambers were replaced by a single "Gothic Hall". The rich decoration of this chamber now offered competition to the elaborate exterior facade. The impressive double-vaulted timber ceiling was restored and extended to cover the entire area, while the vaulting over the two eastern bays dates only from the 19th century. Medallions in the bosses show New Testament scenes, prophets, evangelists and saints. Decoration of the corbels supporting the roof reflects natural and seasonal themes. On the walls mural paintings by Albrecht De Vriendt show scenes from the history of Bruges. Like the monumental mantle-pieces these are 19th-century neo-Gothic enhancements. The stone vault from 1766, which had covered the lower level, was at the same time replaced by a quasi-historical timber structure, supported by four columns that divide the room into two halves.

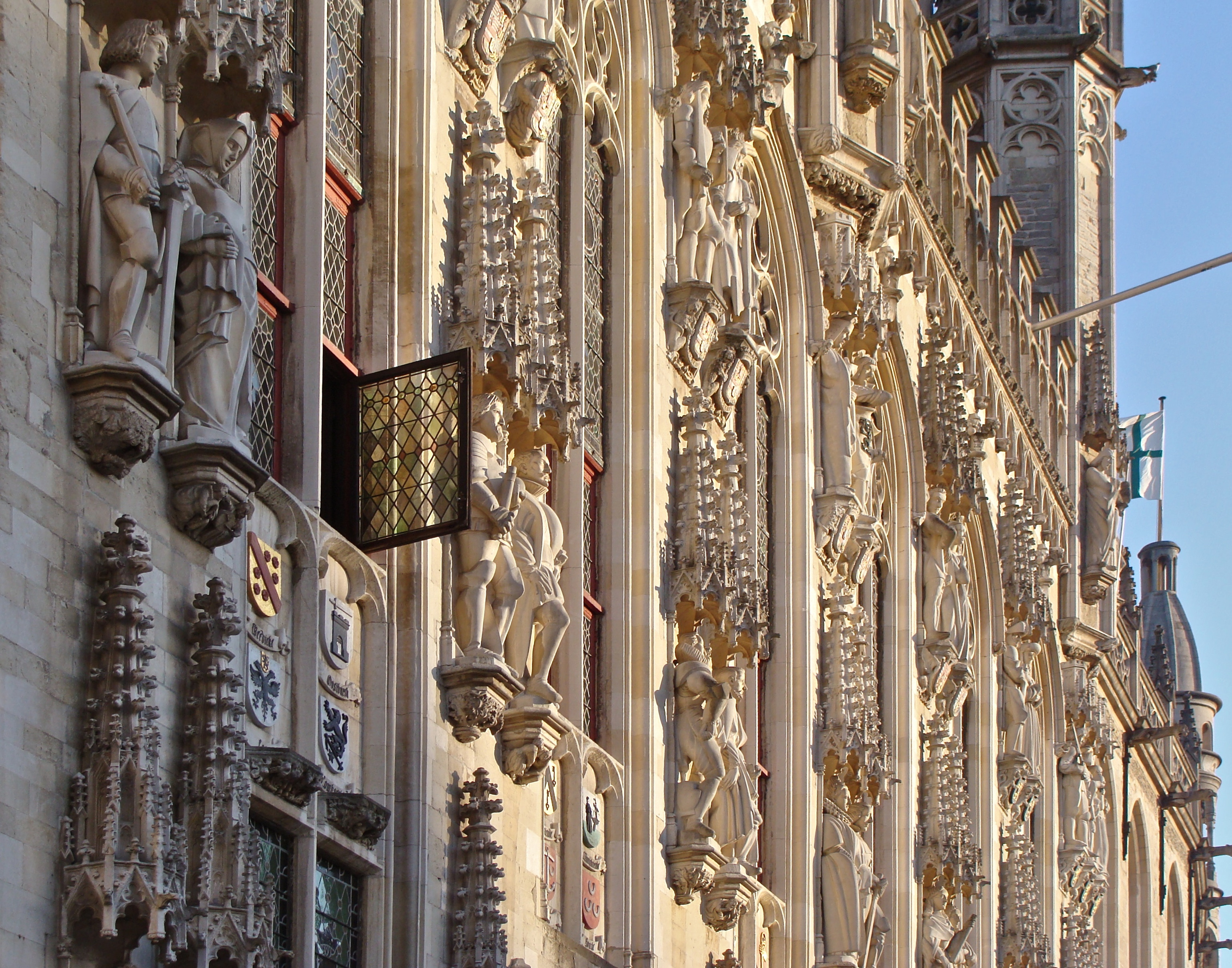
Detail of the facade

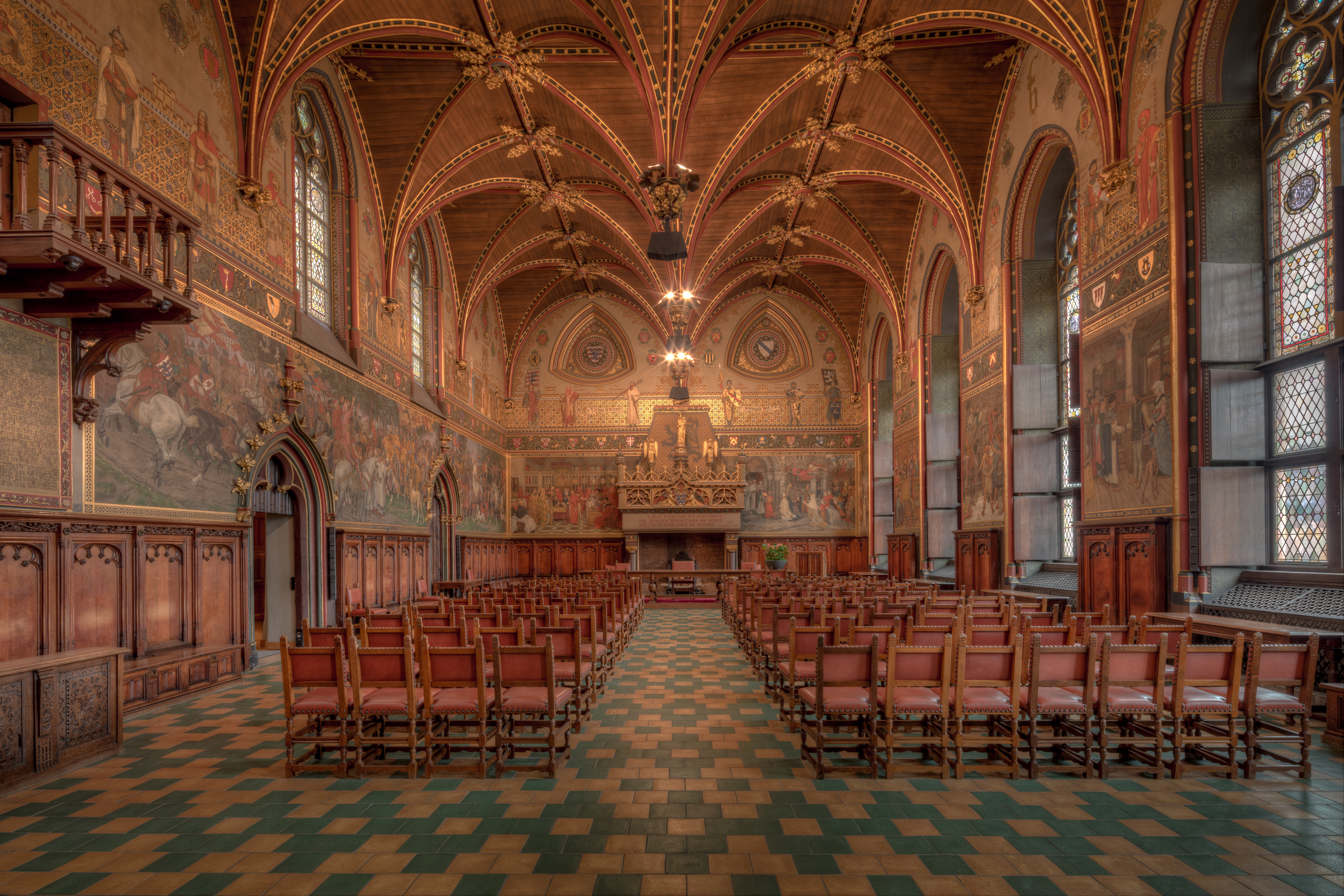
Interior

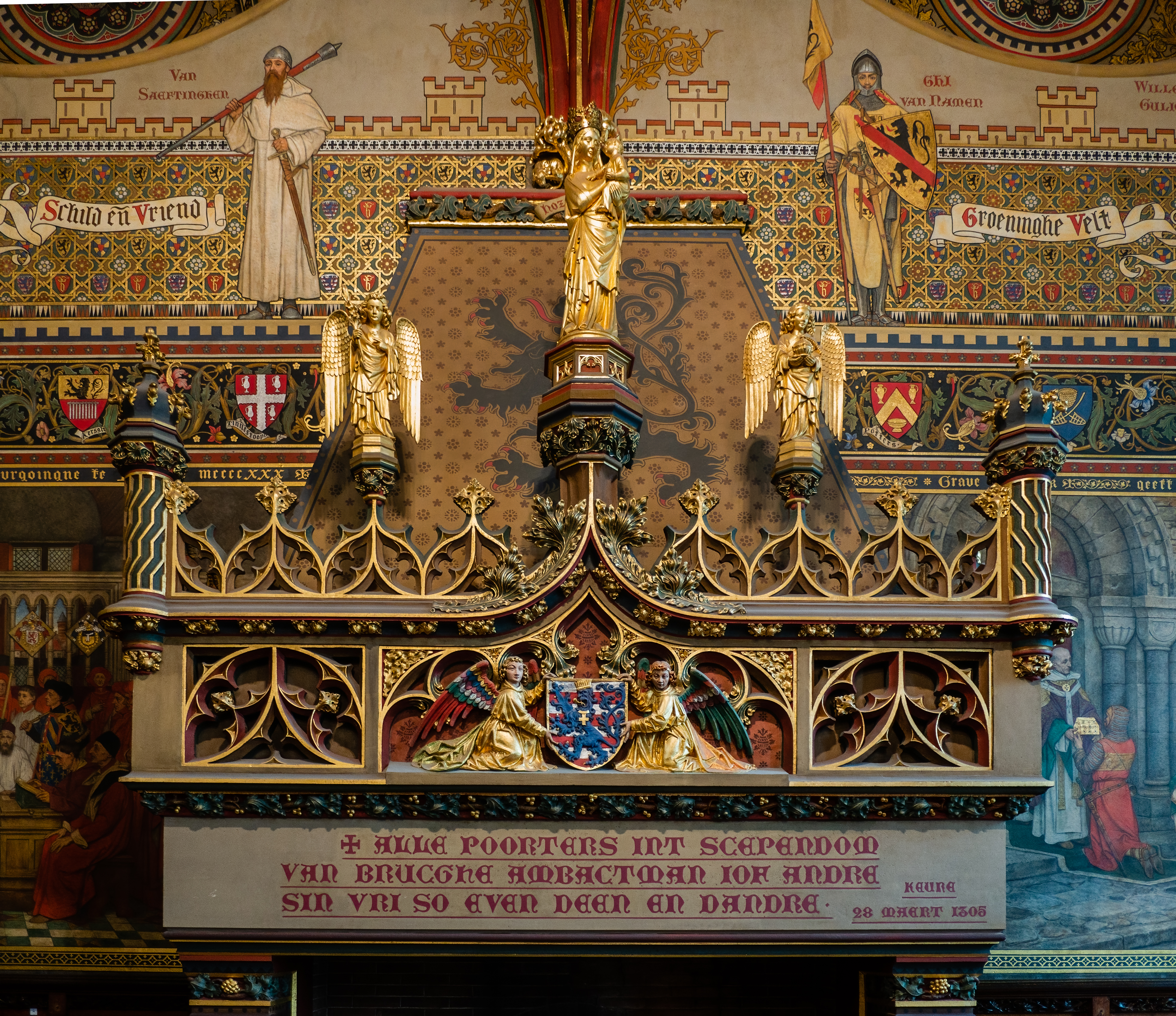
Mantelpiece

== See also ==
- Belfry of Bruges
- St. Salvator's Cathedral
