= Carl Decaluwé =

Belgian politician

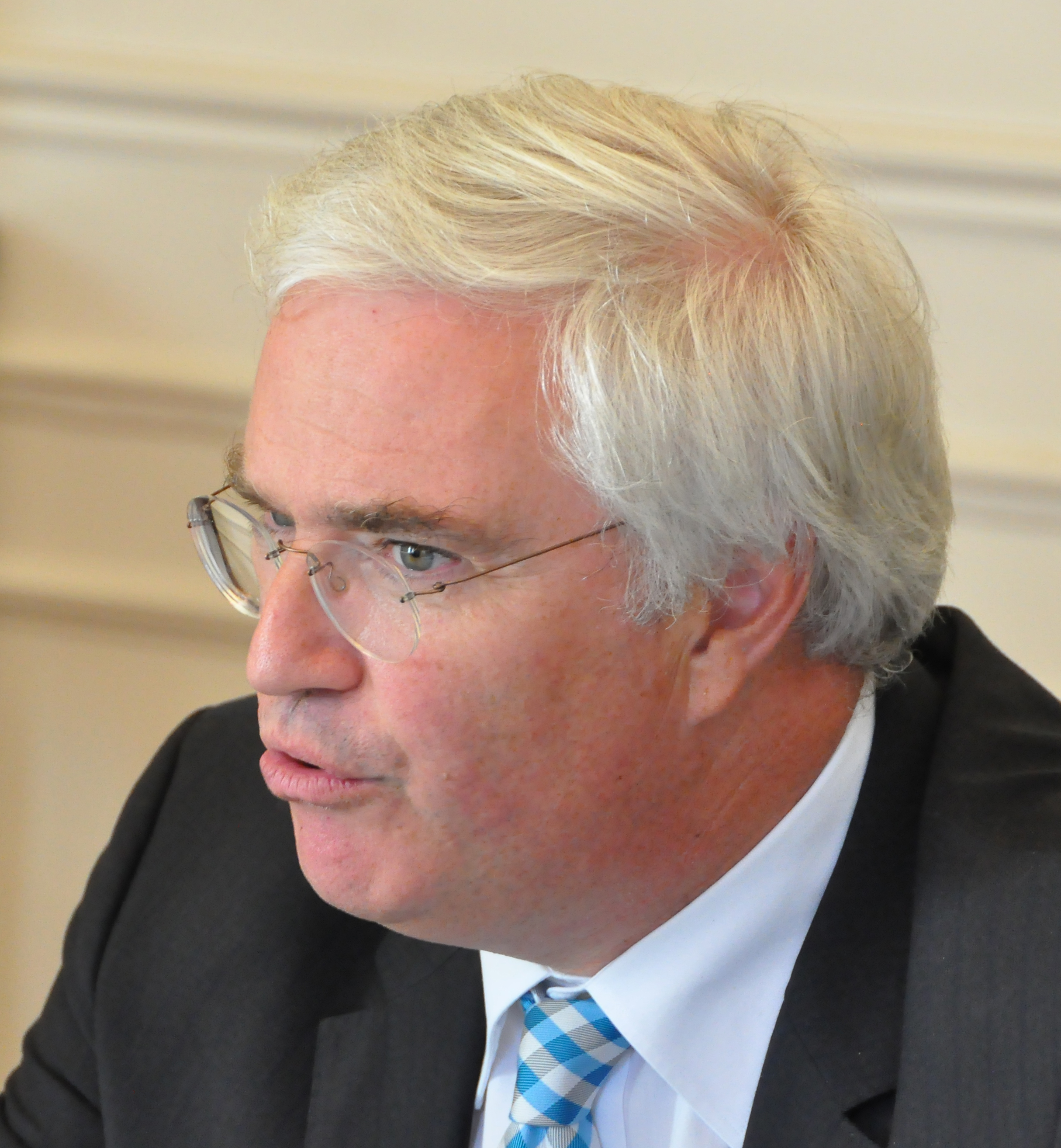

Governor of West Flanders
- Incumbent
- Assumed office 1 February 2012
- Preceded by: Paul Breyne

Personal details
- Born: 18 September 1960 (age 66) Kortrijk, Belgium
- Party: Christen-Democratisch en Vlaams
- Education: Ghent University

Carl Decaluwé (born 18 September 1960) is a Belgian politician who has been the Governor of West Flanders since 2012. He is a member of Christen-Democratisch en Vlaams.

== Early life ==
Decaluwé was born in Kortrijk. He graduated from Ghent University.

== Political career ==
In 2012, he succeeded Paul Breyne as Governor of West Flanders Province. In June 2020, Decaluwé announced the use of thermographic cameras to combat human trafficking and people smuggling along the North Sea coast.
