= Brugse Vrije =

Part of the county of Flanders

Coordinates: 51°12′30.16″N 3°13′39.25″E

Liberty of Bruges Brugse Vrije (Dutch) Franc de Bruges (French)
- Castellany of Flanders
- 1127–1795
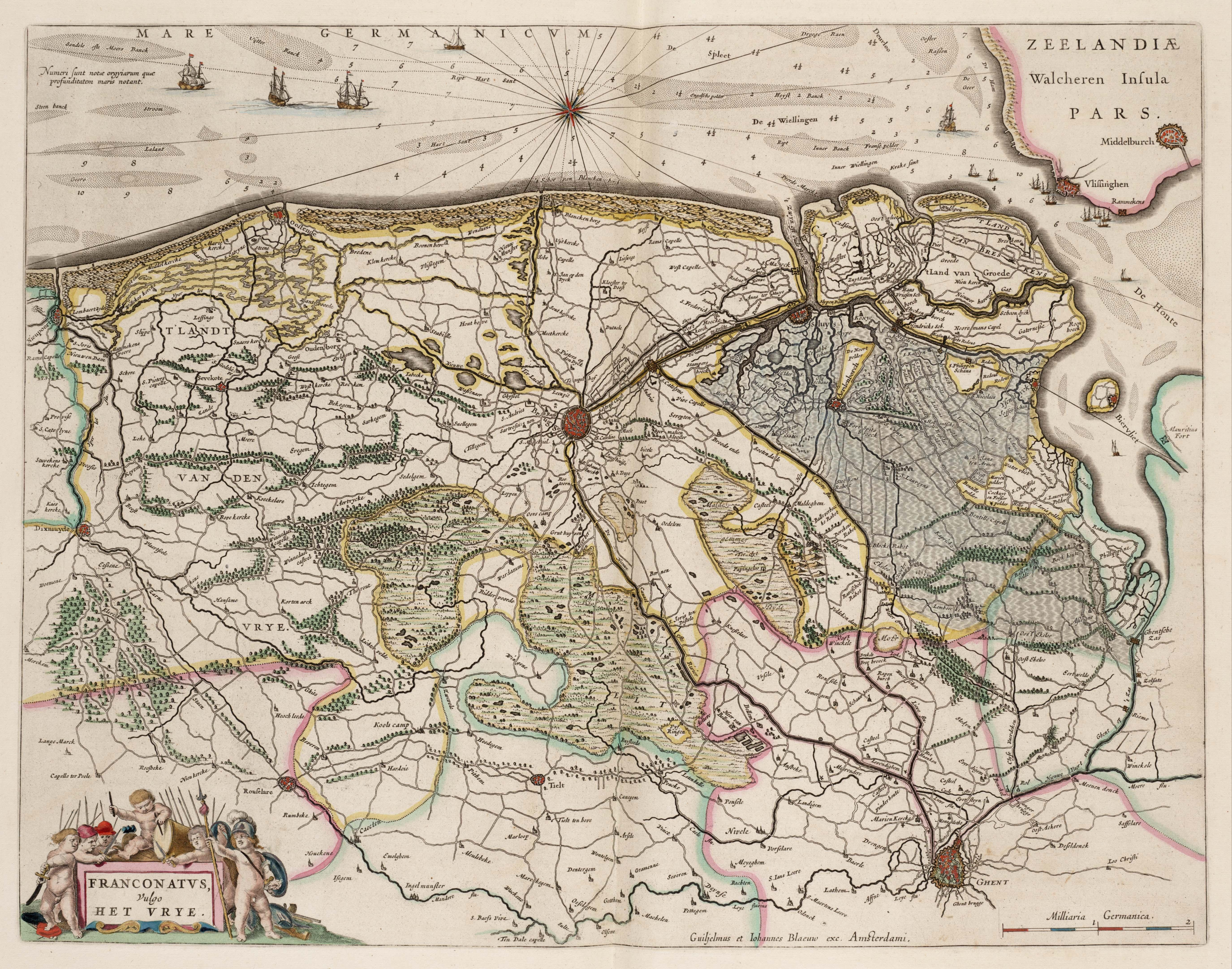
- Map of the Liberty of Bruges, by Willem Janszoon Blaeu, published in 1664.
- Capital: Bruges
- History
  - Castellany of Bruges founded: c. 1000
  - Separation of Bruges from its countryside: 1127
  - Union of Utrecht: 1579
  - Batavian Revolution: 1795
- Today part of: Netherlands; Belgium

The Liberty of Bruges (French: Franc de Bruges; Dutch: Brugse Vrije) was a castellany in the County of Flanders. It included the area around the city of Bruges itself, and was bordered by the North Sea, the Westerschelde and the Yser river. The city of Bruges was separated from the castellany in 1127. Since then the city and the Vrije were considered as separate customary law areas.

The Liberty was a rich agricultural region. It had its own burgrave, who was seated at the Burg, a square in Bruges, and became part of the Four Members of Flanders at the end of the 14th century, together with the three major cities of Ghent, Bruges and Ypres, sitting at the meetings of the States of Flanders.

== Background ==
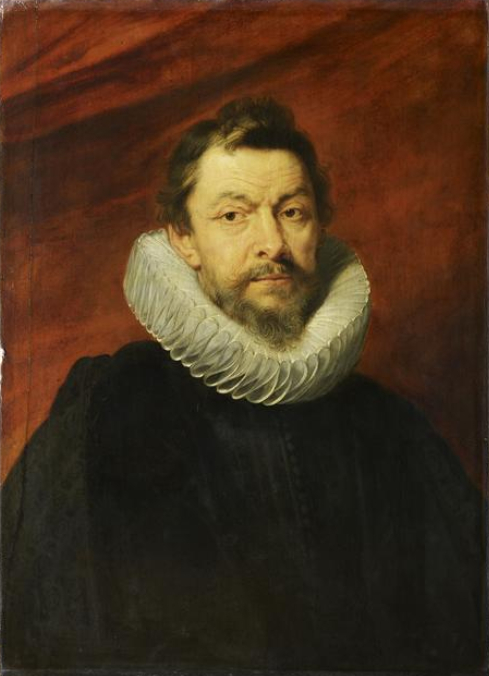
Mayor of the Liberty of Bruges: Henri de Vicq, Lord of Meuleveldt by Rubens

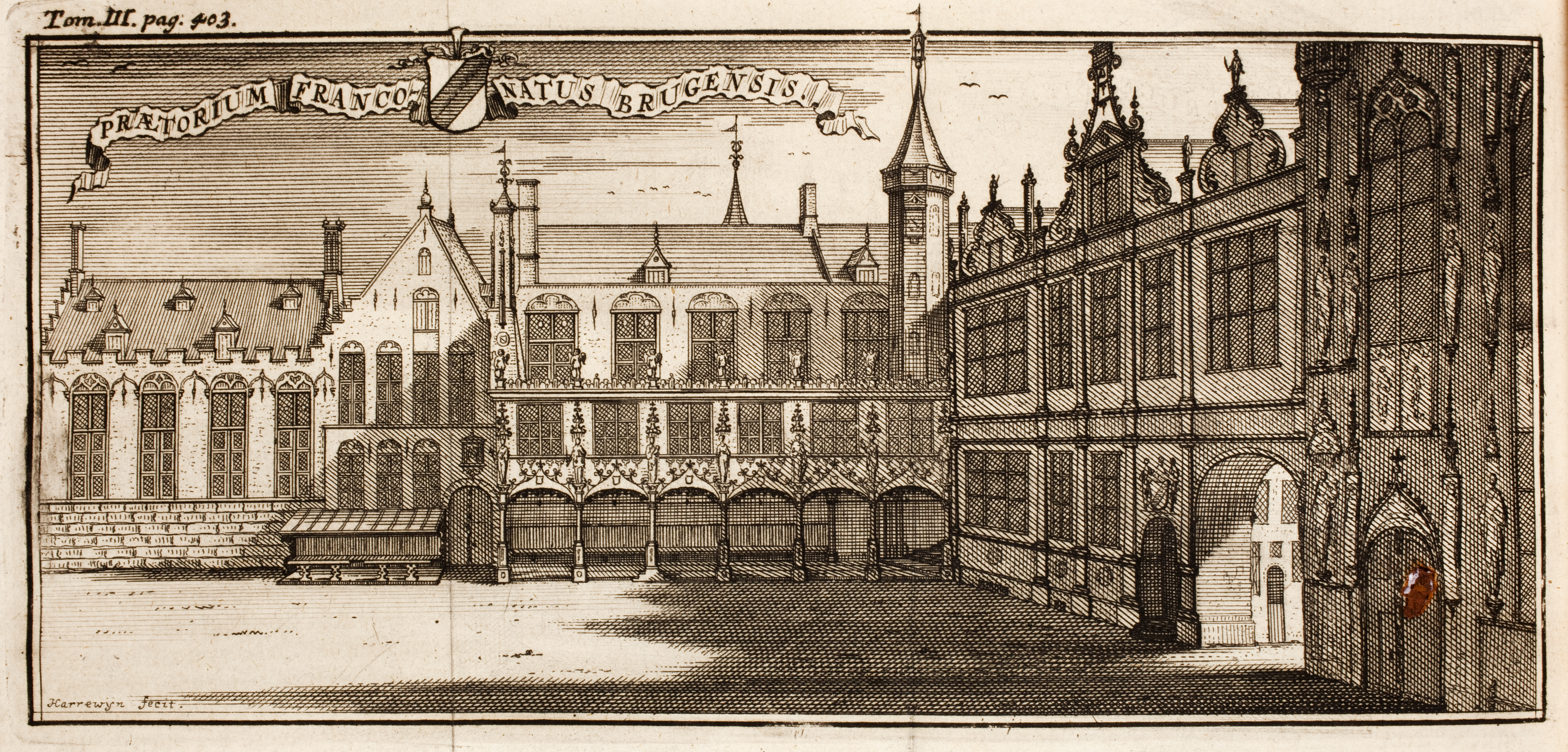
Palace of het Brugse Vrije.

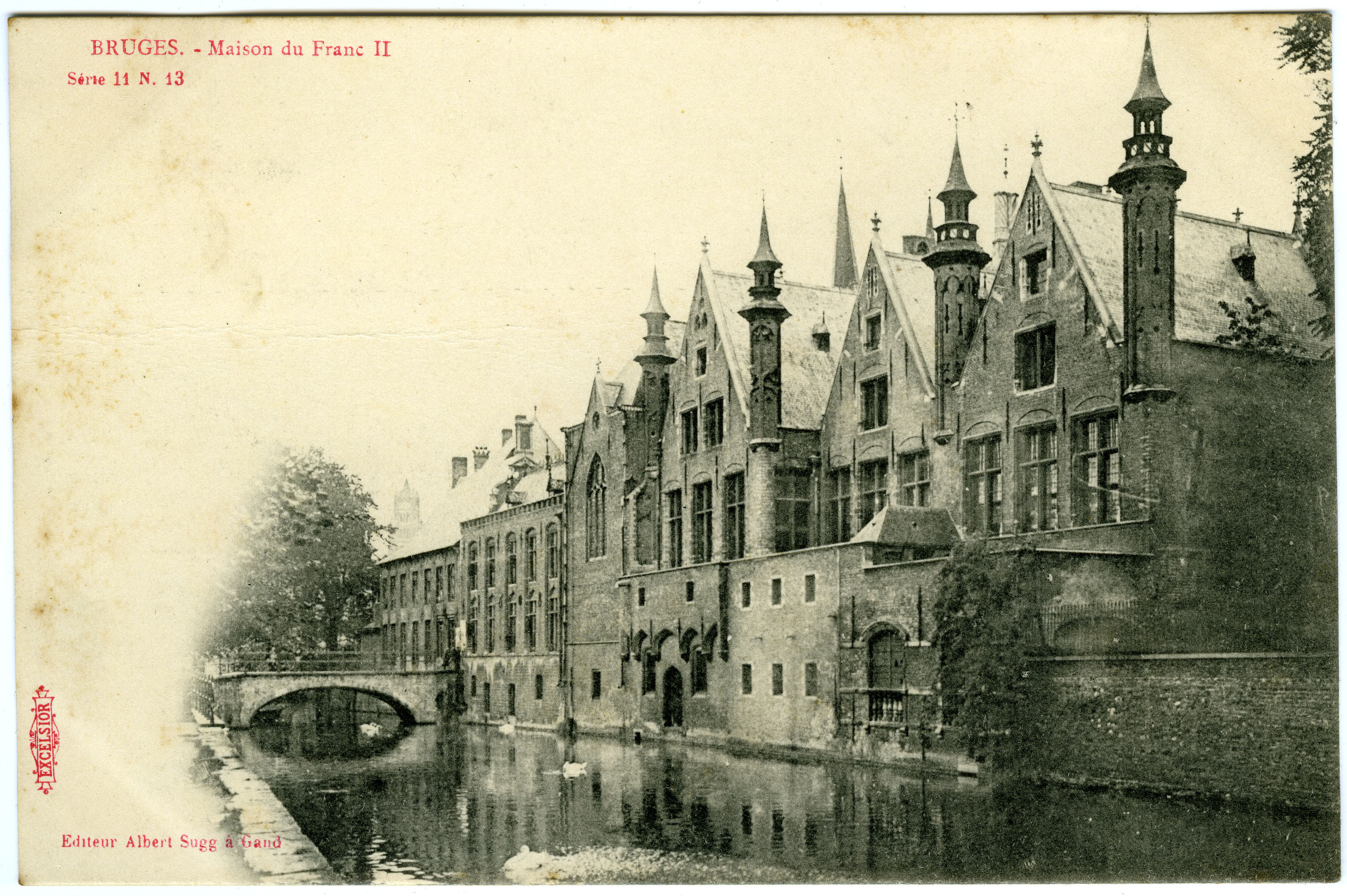
Postcard of the Maison du Franc II (Excelsior Series 11, No. 13, Albert Sugg a Gand; ca. 1905).

The castellany of Bruges was founded at around the year 1000 under the rule of Count Baldwin IV of Flanders (980–1035) as part of the county of Flanders. The head of the castellany was a burgrave, who represented the Count of Flanders. The burgrave was replaced by a bailiff in the 12th century. The fief was first called the Castellany of Bruges, but later took on the name Brugse Vrije. In Middle Ages it was divided into Amts.

== The Manor ==
The governing body of the Liberty of Bruges was located at the Burg, the square in Bruges where both the civil and ecclesiastical administration were located. Initially the Liberty was seated next to the Steen (castle of the count), on the west side of the Burg. In the 15th century, the Liberty moved to the other side, where it took over a portion of the count's former court, the Dukes of Burgundy having moved their residence to the newly built Prinsenhof (Bruges). In 1434–1440 the Liberty added a tribunal to the southern side, facing towards Groenerei, a canal in Bruges. In 1520–1525, the complex was extended along the row with a new high tribunal, the aldermen's chamber and an entrance-hall. The architect was Jan van de Poele. A gallery with high arches was built on the Burg-side in 1528–1532. In 1606–1607, a chapel was added next to the aldermen's chamber and in 1664–1666 an orphan room, in which records of the castellany's orphans were kept. The still existing façades on the Groenerei side was built at this time. Lastly, the part of the manor that is visible on the Burg, and which was significantly enlarged by the purchase of the Love in 1555, was rebuilt in 1722–1727 in the Neoclassical style after a design by Jan Verkruys.

The now classified as heritage (1938) building still exists in this form and was used from 1795 to 1984 as a courthouse. Now the building on the Burg houses the city archives, with the reading room located in the chapel. Next to the old Court of Justice lies the renaissance hall. Located in this former aldermen's chamber of the old Palace of the Liberty of Bruges, is the monumental 16th-century Emperor-Charles-fireplace, made of oak wood, alabaster and marble, designed by Lanceloot Blondeel.

== See also ==
- History of Bruges
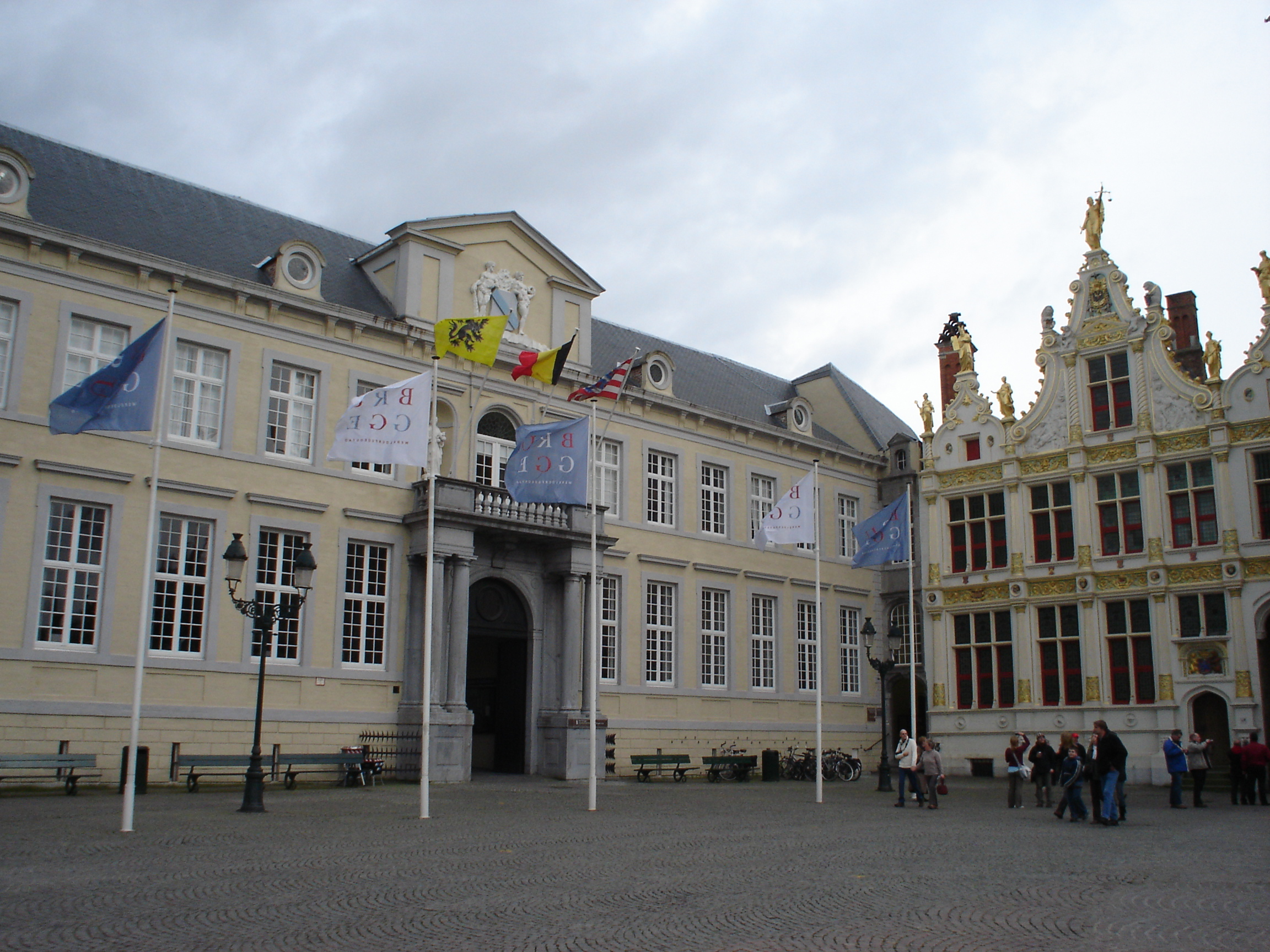
The buildings of the Liberty of Bruges on the 'Burg';
Left: the 18th century classicistic part of the former manor of the Liberty of Bruges.
Right: the old civil registrar (built between 1534 and 1537).

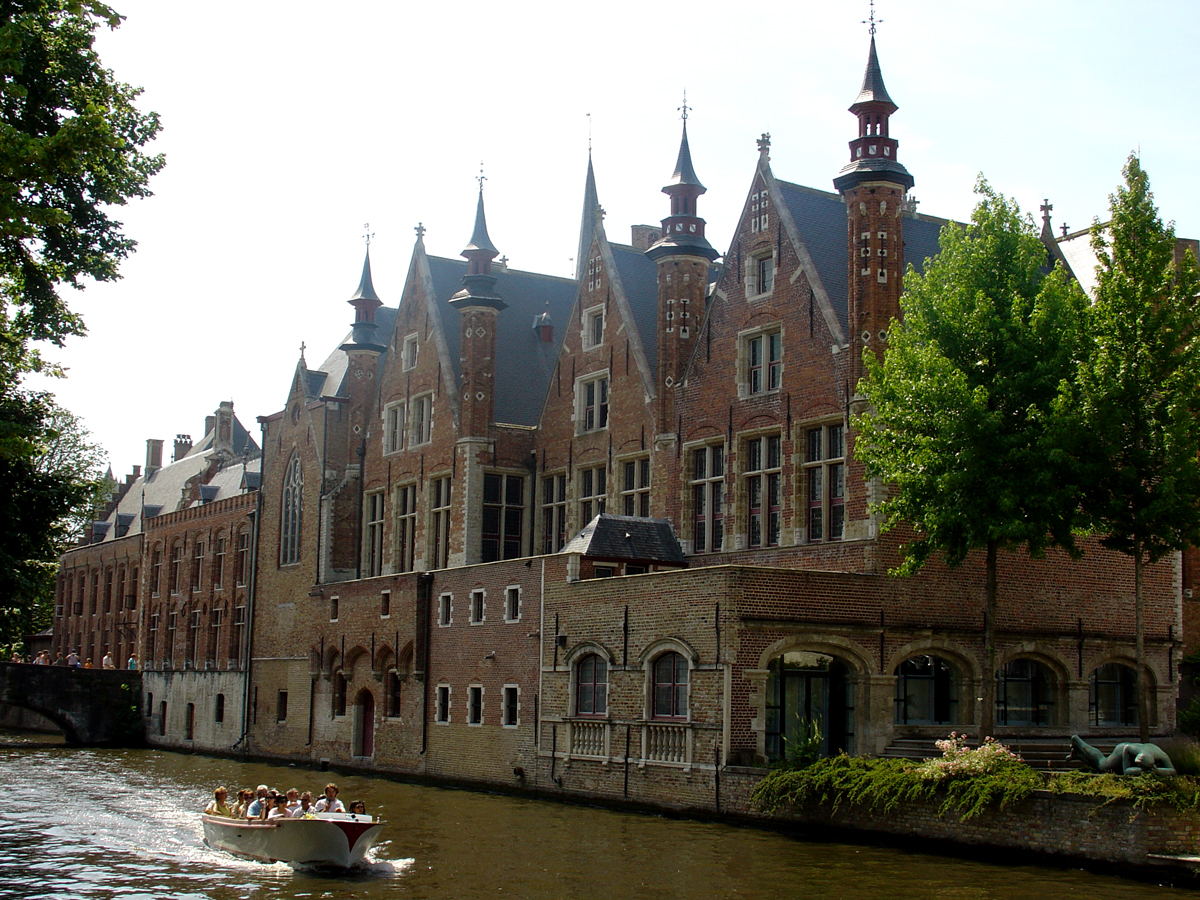
The 16th century rear facade of the manor on the 'Groenerei'.

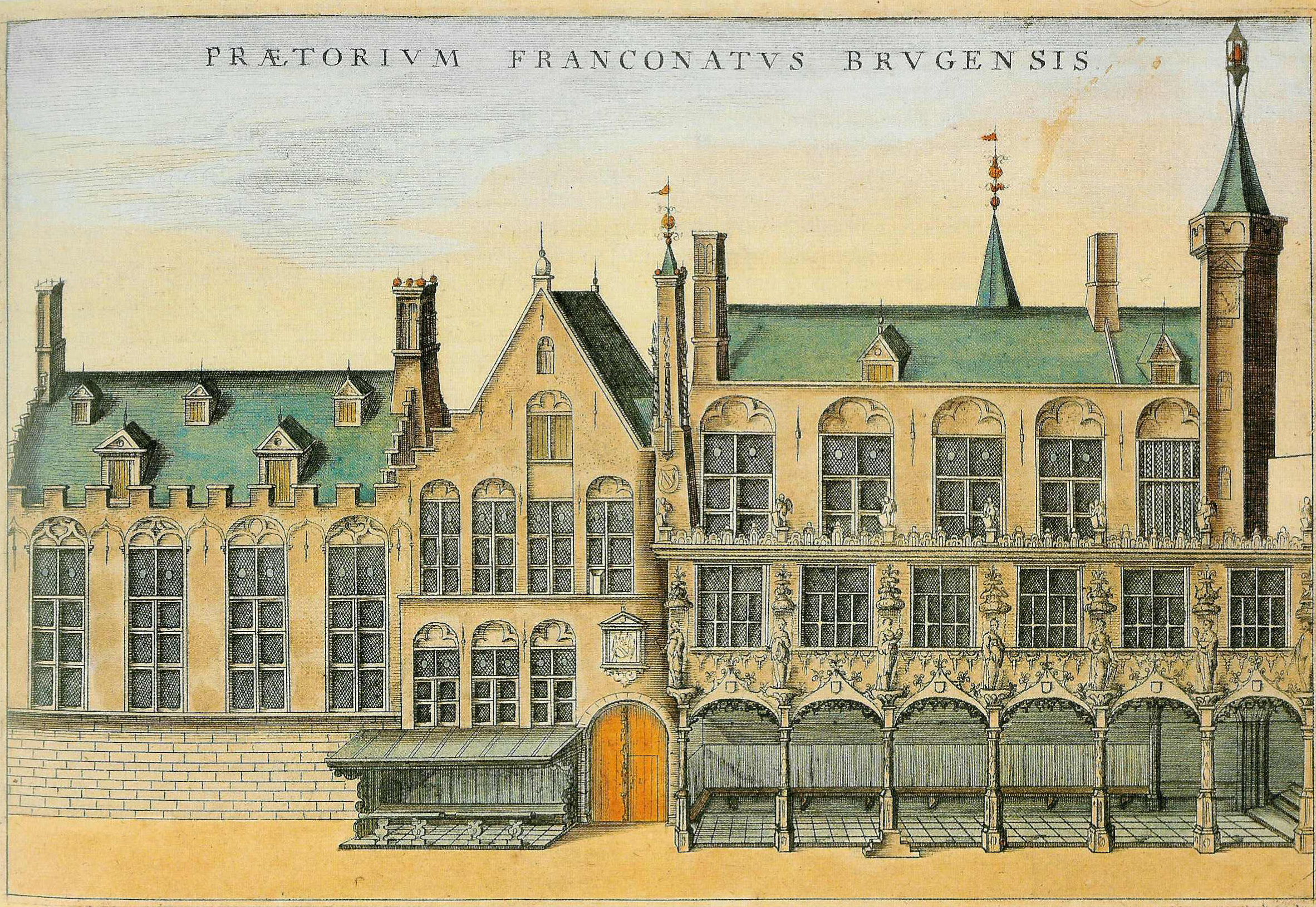
The manor of the Liberty of Bruges in the 17th century.

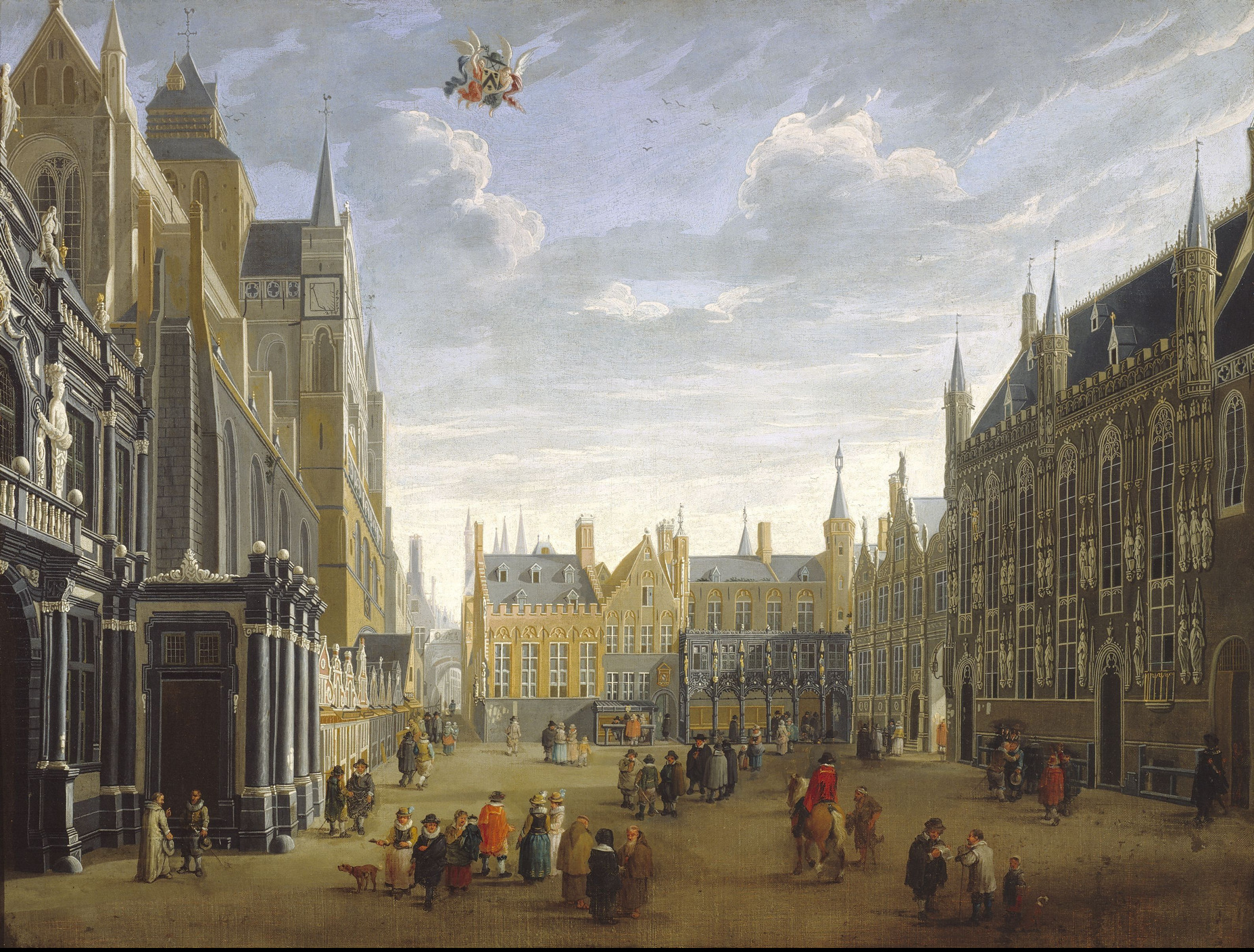
The 'Burg', painted c. 1691–1700 by Jan Baptist van Meunincxhove, with in the background the manor of the Liberty of Bruges and the old civil registry.
