= Roger Windels =

Belgian politician (1924–1996)

23rd Mayor of Torhout
- In office 10 December 1982 – 31 May 1991
- Preceded by: Carlos Daled
- Succeeded by: Norbert De Cuyper

Senator for the Bruges District
- In office 17 April 1977 – 8 November 1987
- Preceded by: Albert Bogaert
- Succeeded by: Johan Weyts

Member of the Flemish Council
- In office 21 October 1980 – 13 December 1987

Personal details
- Born: 18 May 1924 Emelgem, Belgium
- Died: 13 November 1996 (aged 72) Bruges, Belgium
- Party: CVP
- Spouse: Maria Rammant (m. 1948)
- Children: 4
- Education: Ghent University

Roger A. Windels (born 18 May 1924 in Emelgem – died 13 November 1996 in Bruges) was a Belgian, Flemish politician who served as the mayor of the West-Flemish city of Torhout, senator for the Bruges District and Flemish council member.

== Early life ==
Windels studied history in Ghent and following his graduation, he worked as a teacher in the Normaalschool in Torhout. Windels married Maria Rammant on 29 July 1948, and the couple went on to have four children. From 1958 to 1968, Windels served as the chairman of the NCMV (National Christian Middle class Union). He was the founder and provincial chairman, from 1960 to 1995, of the Training Institute for independent professions and self-employed entrepreneurs in West-Flanders (now known as Syntra-West). In 1963, Windels was one of the founders of the Technische School voor Brood- en Banketbakkerij, which later became known as the Ter Groene Poorte culinary school in Bruges. He also served as the principal of the Vrije Handelsinstituut in Bruges.

== Political career ==
Windels became a member of the Christian People's Party (CVP) in 1948 and became leader of the party's Torhout branch the following year. From 1961 to 1967, Windels served as an adviser to minister of Middle class Albert De Clerck and continued to serve in that role under De Clerck's successor Adhémar d'Alcantara. Other duties he had while serving as adviser, were to help the administration and private educational initiatives collaborate, and to translate the notes of the training schools into laws, royal- and ministerial decrees. Windels further served as senator for Bruges from 1977 to 1987, and was amongst others chairman of the senate's commission for education, vice-chairman of the CVP's senate fraction and vice-chairman of the CVP's Bruges district. From May 1977 until October 1980, Windels served as a member of the culture council and the Dutch culture community as a result of a dual mandate. Windels thereafter became a member of the Flemish Council from 21 October 1980 to 12 December 1987.

During the municipal election of 1982, Windels became interested in running for mayor of Torhout and started his campaign to succeed the incumbent socialist mayor Carlos Daled. Windels and his party CVP won the election and he thus became the new mayor of Torhout. However when the next municipal election neared in 1988, Windels considered retiring and attempted to convince Schepen Norbert De Cuyper to run as the leading candidate of the CVP list so that De Cuyper could succeed him as mayor. De Cuyper declined, so Windels continued his campaign and subsequently won re-election, receiving the most preferential votes. However, in the midst of the legislature on 31 May 1991, Windels resigned and De Cuyper succeeded him as mayor.

During his career, Windels was awarded the Pro Ecclesia et Pontifice and was made a knight in the Order of the Crown.

== Later life and death ==
Following his retirement from politics, Windels lived with his wife in Torhout before his death in Bruges on 13 November 1996. He was buried at the de Warande graveyard in Torhout.

== See also ==
- List of mayors of Torhout

Preceded by Carlos Daled	Mayor of Torhout; 1982–1991	Succeeded by Norbert De Cuyper

== Bibliography ==
- Demarest, Patrick (2011). Leve Torhout. Norbert De Cuyper. 20 jaar burgervader (PDF). Apriotief. ISBN 9789081820400.
- De Cuyper, Norbert (1991). Roger Windels en Torhout: terugblik ten afscheid. Lannoo. ISBN 9020920537.
- van Molle, Paul (1972). Het Belgisch parlement 1894-1972. Standaard. ISBN 9789002121951.
- Rotsaert, Koen (2006). Lexicon van de parlementariers uit het arrondissement Brugge. (1830-1995). Van De Wiele. ISBN 9789076297330.
