= Paul Breyne =

Belgian politician (born 1947)

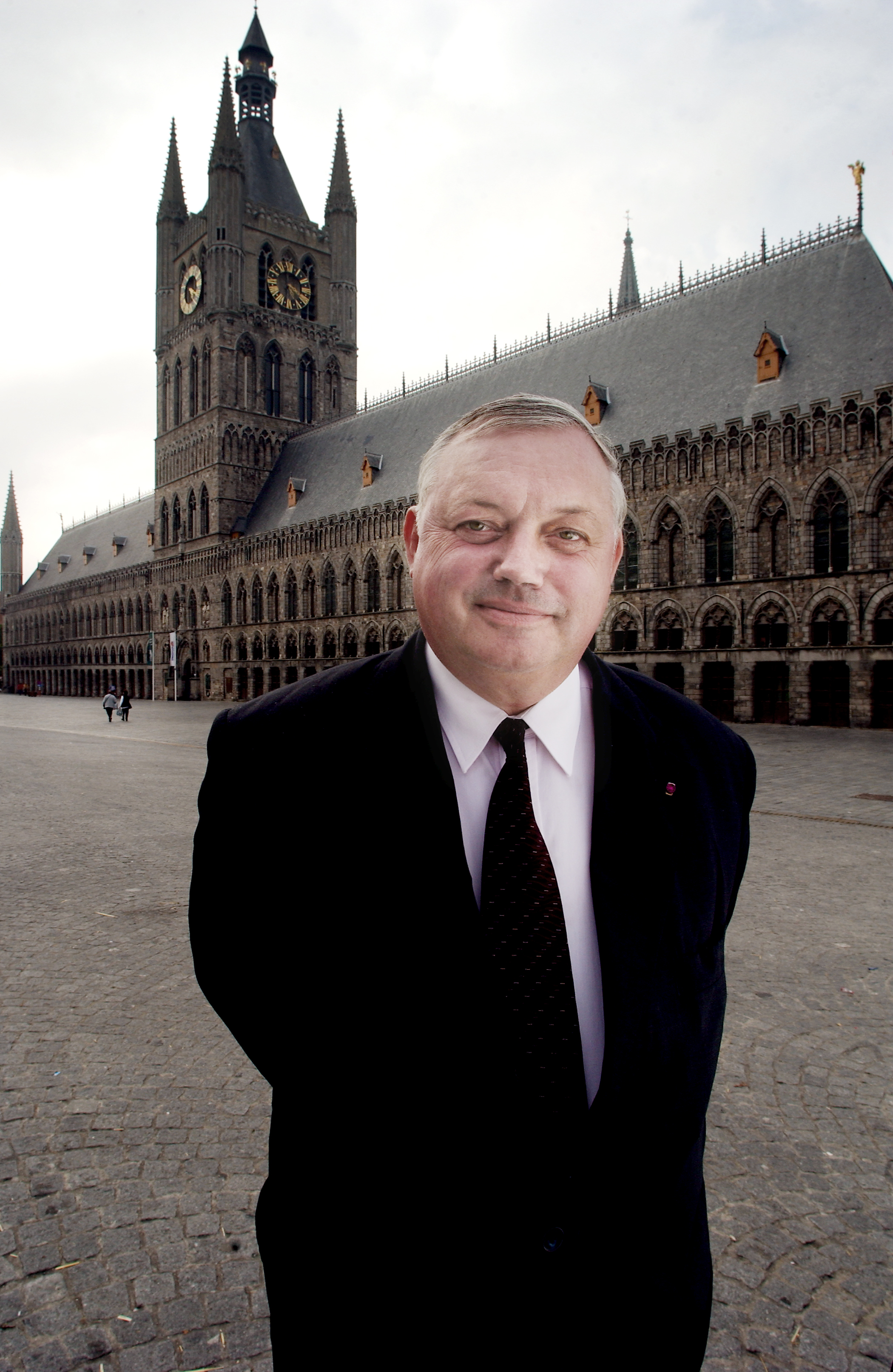
- Breyne outside the Ypres Cloth Hall

Governor of West Flanders
- In office 1997–2012
- Succeeded by: Carl Decaluwé

Personal details
- Party: Christian Democratic and Flemish

Paul Breyne (born 10 January 1947) is a Belgian politician who served as Governor of West Flanders between 1997 and 2012. He is a member of Christian Democratic and Flemish.
