= Torhout City Hall =

- Stadhuis van Torhout (Dutch)
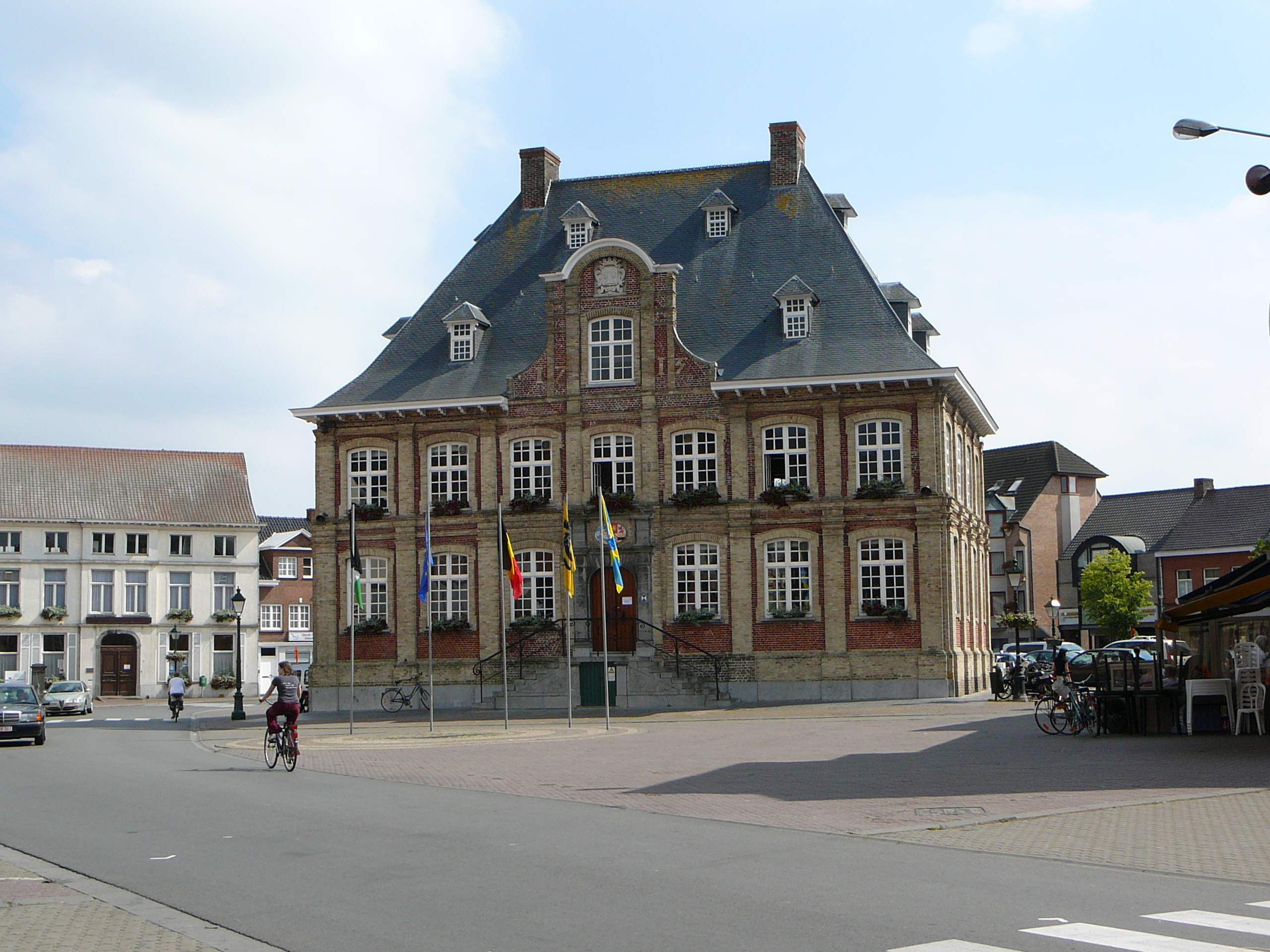
- The City Hall in 2006
- Interactive map of the Torhout City Hall area

General information
- Type: City hall
- Architectural style: German Baroque style
- Location: Markt 1; 8820 Torhout, Belgium
- Coordinates: 51.078925°N 3.05948351°E
- Construction started: 1711
- Completed: 1713
- Inaugurated: 1713
- Client: Charles III Philip
- Owner: City of Torhout

Height
- Height: 22 m (72 ft)

Technical details
- Floor count: 3

The City Hall (Dutch: Stadhuis) of Torhout, West Flanders, Belgium, was the residence of the mayor and the bench of aldermen during their meetings up until the completion of the new City Hall in 2014. It is located on the market square in the city center.

== Predecessors ==
Torhout received its city privileges in 1183–1184 from Count Philip I of Flanders. At this time the city was already growing in size, and, thanks to the newly received privileges, a City Hall could be built. The first City Hall was built on exactly the same place as the current one, but in 1184 it was located near the Cloth Hall, the Belfry, the church, the wool market and the cloth market. The City Hall stood firm until Torhout was attacked in 1578 during the religious troubles of the late 16th century. The church's interior and archive documents (from the 11th-16th century) from the City Hall were already burned and destroyed by the Geuzen during the Beeldenstorm of 1566, but this time most of the medieval buildings, including the church, the City Hall, the Cloth Hall and the hospital, were lost.

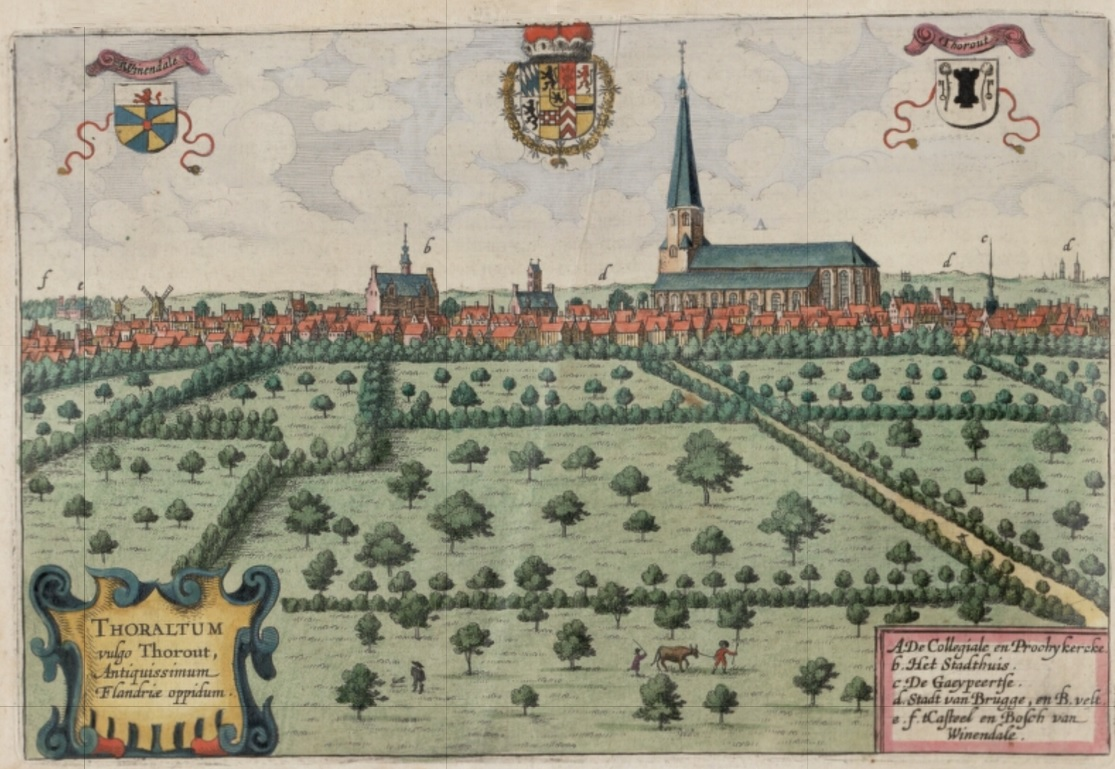
Torhout in 1641, the City Hall can be seen on the left.

Torhout slowly recovered from the damage that was inflicted in 1578 and finally managed to build another City Hall in the early 17th century some 20 meters southwest from the original City Hall's location. The second City Hall can be seen on the left side of a 1641 drawing from the book Flandria Illustrata. This City Hall only had a short existence as it was destroyed in a fire in 1647.

== History of the current City Hall ==
The City Hall that still stands to this day was built in German Baroque style during the period of 1711 to 1713 on the request of Charles III Philip, Lord of Wijnendale. His family crest can still be found above the front entrance of the building. The building stood on its own until 1806, when a prison was built right next to it. The prison only stood until 1864 before being demolished and replaced with a music school. Other buildings also joined the City Hall, including a printing office and some regular houses. There were plans to demolish the City Hall during the 19th century because it was getting too small; it was saved from this fate because of money shortage.

=== World War I ===
Torhout was occupied by the invading German army on 15 October 1914 and the City Hall was turned into a German Kommandantur. The city itself was located only 20 kilometers from the trenches so it was used as a hospital and resting city by the Germans. Because of the close range, a number of bombs fell on the city as well as some bombardments from the Allies during 1916. The war was a big blow to the city, many buildings were destroyed or damaged during the bombardments but miraculously the City Hall was unharmed despite the music school located right next to it being severely damaged. During the final weeks of the war the Allies advanced and made their way to Torhout. During this time the Germans panicked and decided to loot Torhout as well as to destroy any strategic places in the city. This resulted in the destruction of the Train station, some schools, all remaining windmills (some medieval) and the church tower. The German Kommandatur left the city on 10 October 1918, leaving the City Hall unoccupied and also luckily undamaged. During the Battle of Torhout-Tielt from 14-30 October 1918, the last of the Germans were chased out of the city and the Allies were received as heroes in the badly damaged city on 18 October 1918.

=== Post-war ===
Torhout licked its wounds after the war and tried to repair as much of the damage as possible. They managed to repair the church as well as most of the houses and schools which were afflicted in the conflict. The City Hall regained its former title as City Hall and its surrounding buildings were repaired as well.

=== World War II ===
War terrorized Torhout again as Belgium was invaded by the German army in May 1940. On 25 May 1940 Torhout was bombarded by the Luftwaffe, with fire bombs resulting in the destruction of the church as well as some nearby houses. The City Hall was unharmed even though it was only located some 50 meters from the church. On that same day the King of Belgium was just a mile or two away in the Castle of Wijnendale together with the Prime Minister and three other ministers. It was there that the king would sign the capitulation of Belgium, which resulted in the Royal Question after the war. Torhout was bombed again on 26 May, 27 May and 13 August, which damaged the hospital and some schools. Torhout was occupied for 4 years before Canadian troops liberated the city on 6 and 7 September 1944. It was also during the occupation that the City Hall was classified as a monument on 29 November 1943.

=== Rest of the 20th century ===
The City Hall's interior was modernised in 1949, but the 18th-century stucco ceilings, with depictions of musical instruments, archers and writing tools, were lost. The rear side of the building was also reconstructed during 1951–1952. The surrounding houses near City Hall were demolished between 1950 and 1980, making it a stand-alone building. City Hall was also restored during 1995–1997.

== Modern day ==
City Hall was classified as architectural heritage on 5 October 2009, and the building celebrated its 300th birthday in 2013 and was therefore decorated with red ribbons. City Hall continued to be used by the mayor and the bench of aldermen until 2014, when a new City Hall was built. After the new City Hall became operational, the old City Hall was given a new purpose, and it now serves as the tourist information center. There is also a large car park located behind City Hall where the former prison, printing office and music school stood.
