= Jan Baptist van Meunincxhove =

Flemish Painter, active in Bruges

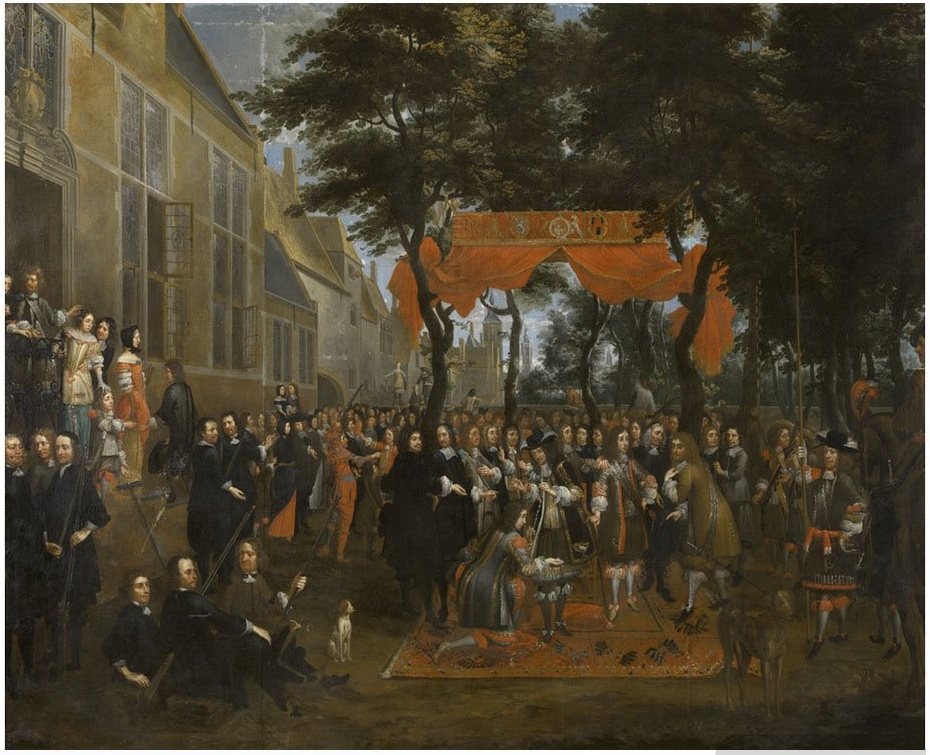
The Reception of Charles II and his Brothers in the Schuttershof

Jan Baptist van Meunincxhove (c. 1620/25 – 1703/04) was a Flemish painter of cityscapes, architectural paintings, marine views and group portraits who was active in Bruges. Without being original, he maintained a high standard of painting at a time when art in Flanders was in decline.

== Life ==
Details about the life of Jan Baptist van Meunincxhove are few. He was born around 1620-25 and became in 1639 a pupil of the leading artist Jacob van Oost in Bruges. Van Meunincxhove became a master in the Bruges Guild of Saint Luke in 1644.

He is recorded in Antwerp in 1677 when he became a master in the Antwerp Guild of Saint Luke. Later he returned to Bruges where he is recorded between 1682 and 1704, the year in which he likely died there.

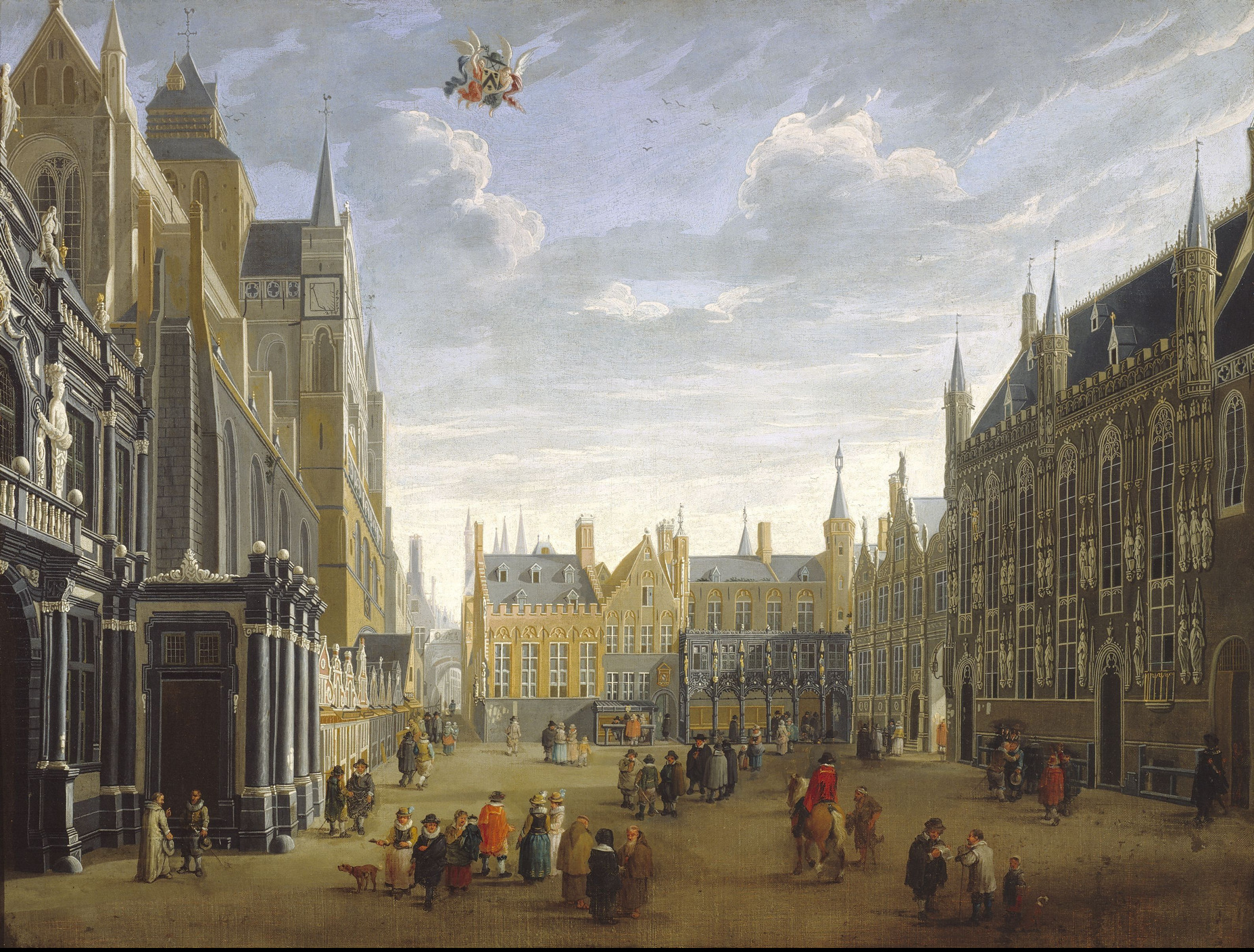
The Burg in Bruges

Joseph van den Kerckhove was his pupil.

== Work ==
While his master Jacob van Oost was mainly known as a history and portrait painter, Jan Baptist van Meunincxhove's artistic path ventured into more diverse directions. He is known to have worked in a wide range of genres including architectural paintings of churches, city views, group scenes, marine views, landscapes and history paintings.

Jan Baptist van Meunincxhove produced two sets of views of the city centre of Bruges: each set consisted of a view of the central square and the Burg Square in Bruges (both sets are in the Groeningemuseum in Bruges). The first set was produced in 1672 and the second set in the 1690s. The figures in these cityscapes may be by the hand of other masters.

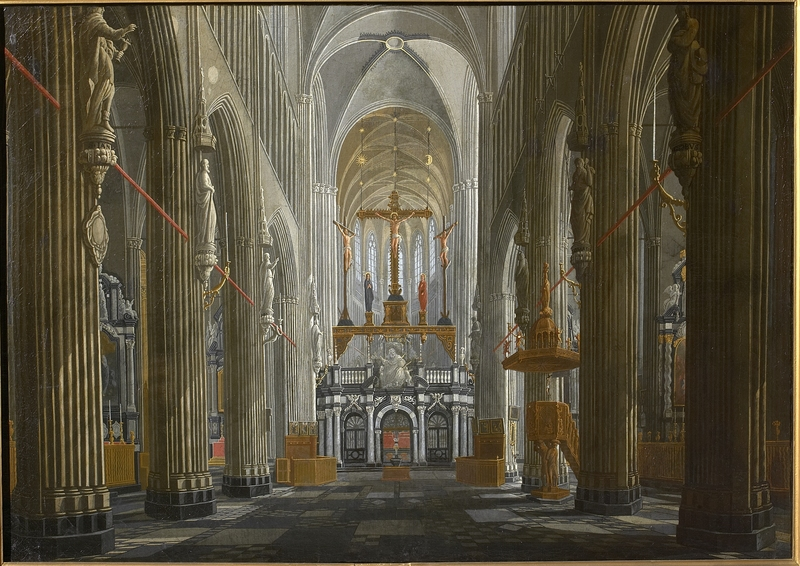
Nave of the St. Salvator's Church

Jan Baptist van Meunincxhove further painted two views of the interiors of the Saint Donatus and Saint Salvator churches in Bruges (first painting now in the Groeningemuseum and the other on location in the church itself).

Van Meunincxhove painted two remarkable paintings documenting events which occurred during the residence in Bruges of Charles II of England and his brothers Henry Stuart, Duke of Gloucester and James Stuart, Duke of York in the period from 22 April 1656 to 15 March 1659. On 2 October 1656 the King and his brothers visited the Bruges Guild of the 'Kolveniers' (Guild of Harquebusiers) where the Duke of York successfully shot the target (a parrot). This was cause for great celebration among the local population and was immediately recorded in a poem by Ingelbrecht Cockuyt of the Bruges Chamber of Rhetoric. Van Meunincxhove remembered the same event about 15 years later in two works that were destined for the new premises of the Guild of the Kolveniers (both now in the Groeningemuseum). One of the compositions depicts the celebration meal and the other the King and his retinue in the 'Hoveningen', the walled garden of the Guild. In the second picture depicting the Hoveningen, van Meunincxhove follows the style of genre paintings developed in Flanders after 1660 by artists such as Gillis van Tilborch: he depicts the two groups of three persons on the left foreground on a small scale while the persons surrounding the King have an abnormally long leg which serves to pull the viewer into the depth of the composition. The fabric of the clothing is rendered in rich detail while the artist also depicts some anecdotic details such as the children who climb the wall to better view the event. The second painting depicting the celebration meal includes a representation of the painting of the Hoveningen.

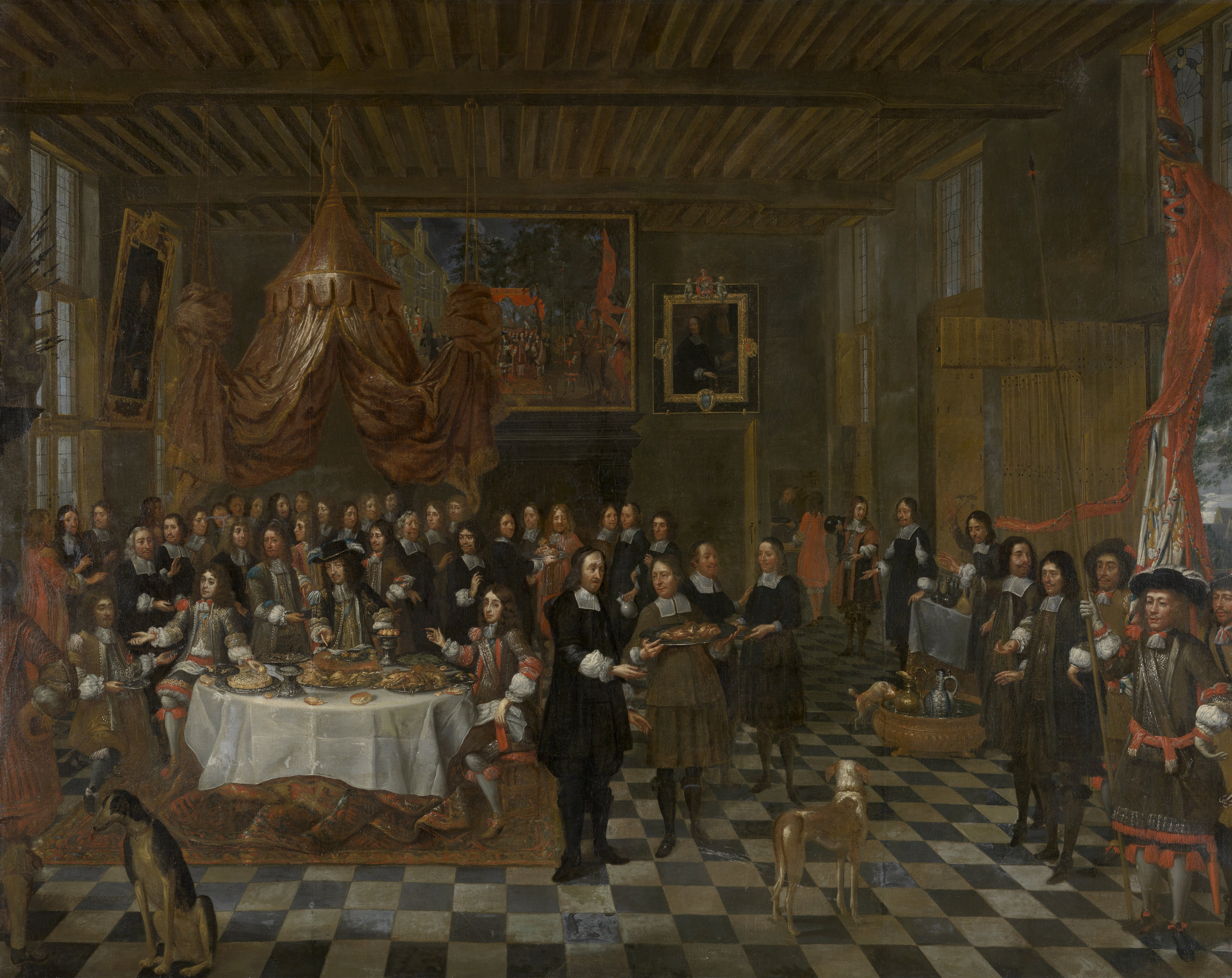
Reception of Charles II and his Brother by the Bruges Guild of St Barbara

Van Meunincxhove also painted a number of compositions with religious subjects, which are now found in churches in Bruges such as the St Anne's Church. He was further known as a landscape and marine painter.
