= Sint-Jozef =

Quarter of the city of Bruges, Belgium

- Quarter of Bruges
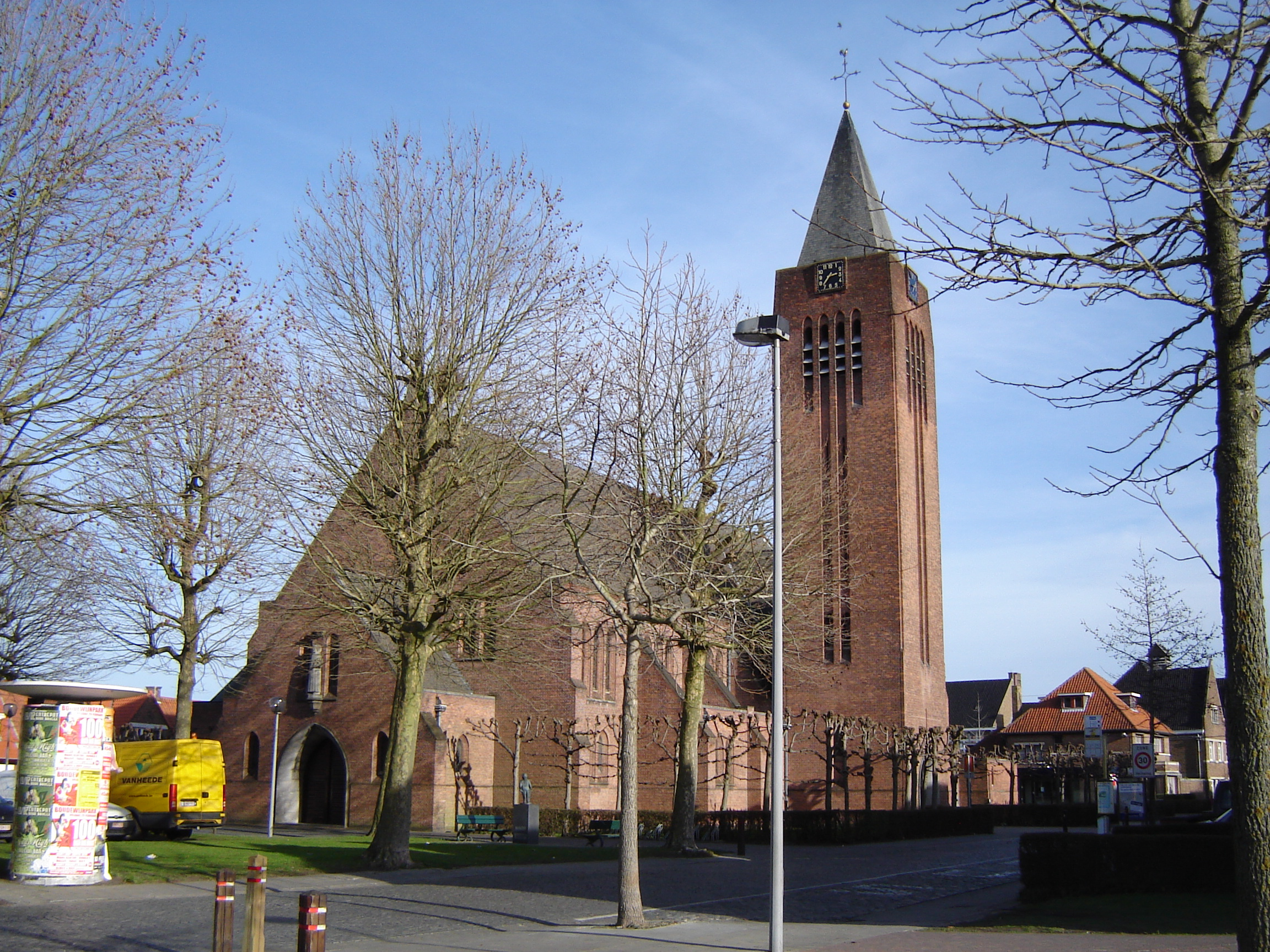
- St. Joseph Church

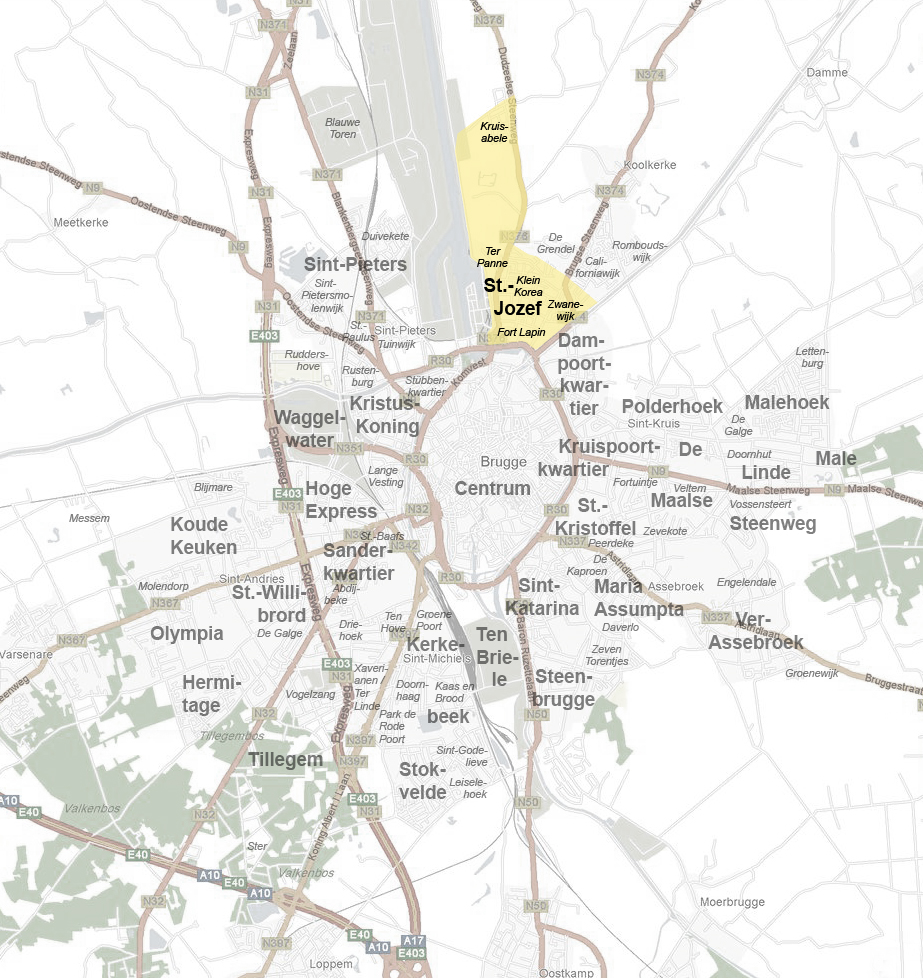
- Location of Sint-Jozef in Bruges
- Interactive map of Sint-Jozef
- Location within Belgium Location within West Flanders
- Coordinates: 51°13′34″N 3°14′6″E
- Country: Belgium
- Community: Flemish Community
- Region: Flemish Region
- Province: West Flanders
- Arrondissement: Bruges
- Municipality: Bruges

Population (2014-12-31)
  - Total: 5,416
- Postal codes: 8000
- Area codes: 050

Sint-Jozef is a quarter in Bruges, which is the capital of the Flemish province of West Flanders, in Belgium.
