= The Golden Basket =

1936 children's book by Ludwig Bemelmans

- Author: Ludwig Bemelmans
- Illustrator: Ludwig Bemelmans
- Language: English
- Genre: Children's literature
- Publisher: Viking
- Publication date: 1936
- Publication place: United States

The Golden Basket is a 1936 children's novel written and illustrated by Ludwig Bemelmans. It tells the story of a family's visit to Bruges and marks the first appearance of the author's best-known character, Madeline. The novel was a Newbery Honor recipient in 1937.

In the novel, two sisters, Celeste and Melisande, stay at the Golden Basket hotel in Bruges with their father, Horatio Coggeshall of London. They befriend Jan, the innkeeper's son, and encounter several of the other guests. On a visit to Bruges cathedral with Jan, they meet a dozen little schoolgirls, including Madeline.

The novel draws on the author's experience of hotel life—he was raised in his father's hotel in Austria and worked in American hotels as a young man. A visit to Belgium with his wife provided the inspiration for the setting. The illustrations show many of the sights of Bruges.
