= Zwankendamme =

Village of the city of Bruges, Belgium

- Village of Bruges
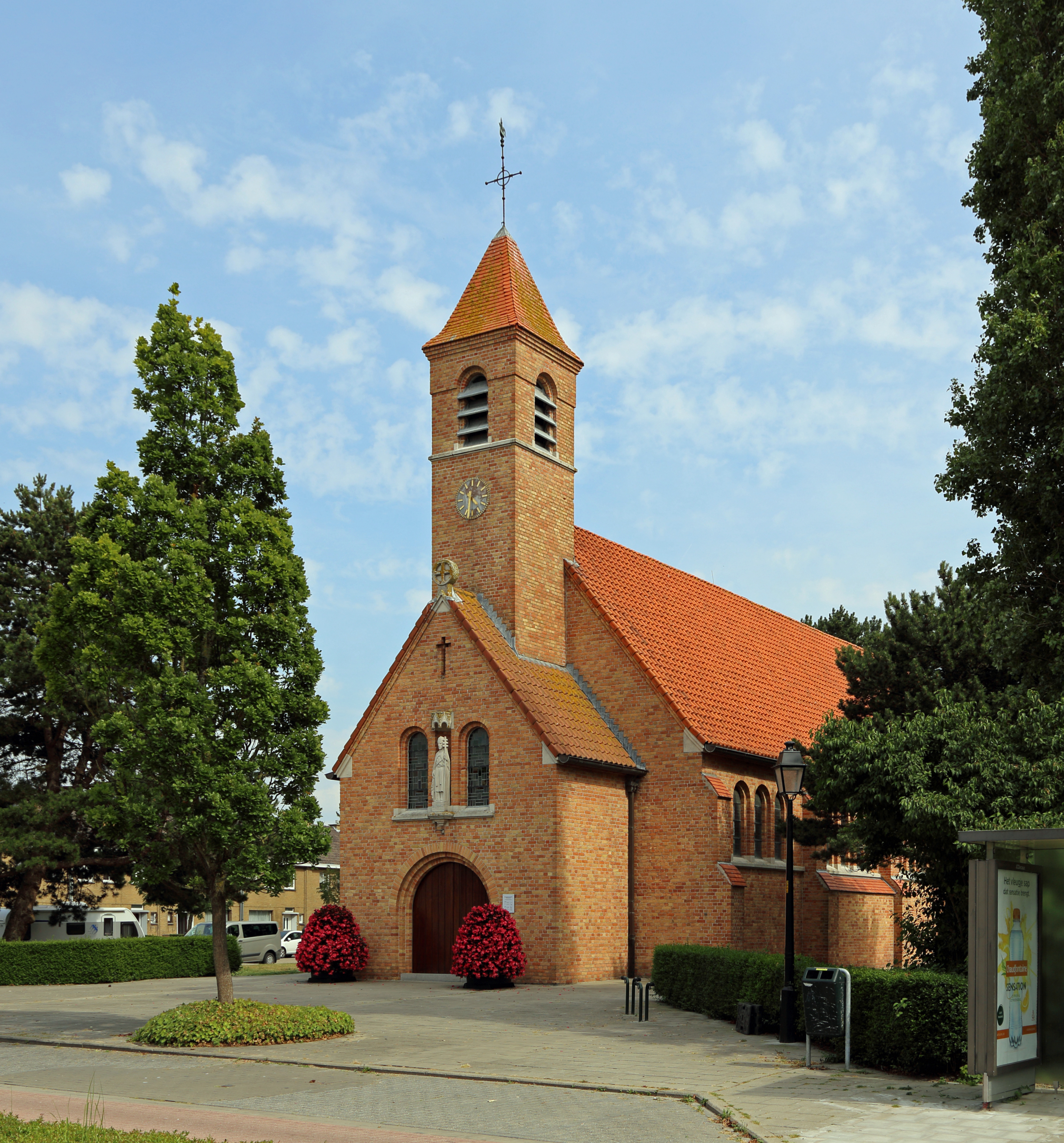
- Interactive map of Zwankendamme
- Location within Belgium Location within West Flanders
- Coordinates: 51°18′33″N 3°11′48″E
- Country: Belgium
- Community: Flemish Community
- Region: Flemish Region
- Province: West Flanders
- Arrondissement: Bruges
- Municipality: Bruges

Population (2014-12-31)
  - Total: 680
- Postal codes: 8380
- Area codes: 050

Zwankendamme (Dutch pronunciation: [ˈzʋɑŋkə(n)ˌdɑmə]) is a village of Bruges located in the province of West Flanders, Flemish Region, Belgium. Its name was first mentioned in writing in 1357. The Zwankendam parish church, built in 1938, is dedicated to Leo the Great.
