= Brugse Belofte =

Catholic parade in Bruges, Belgium

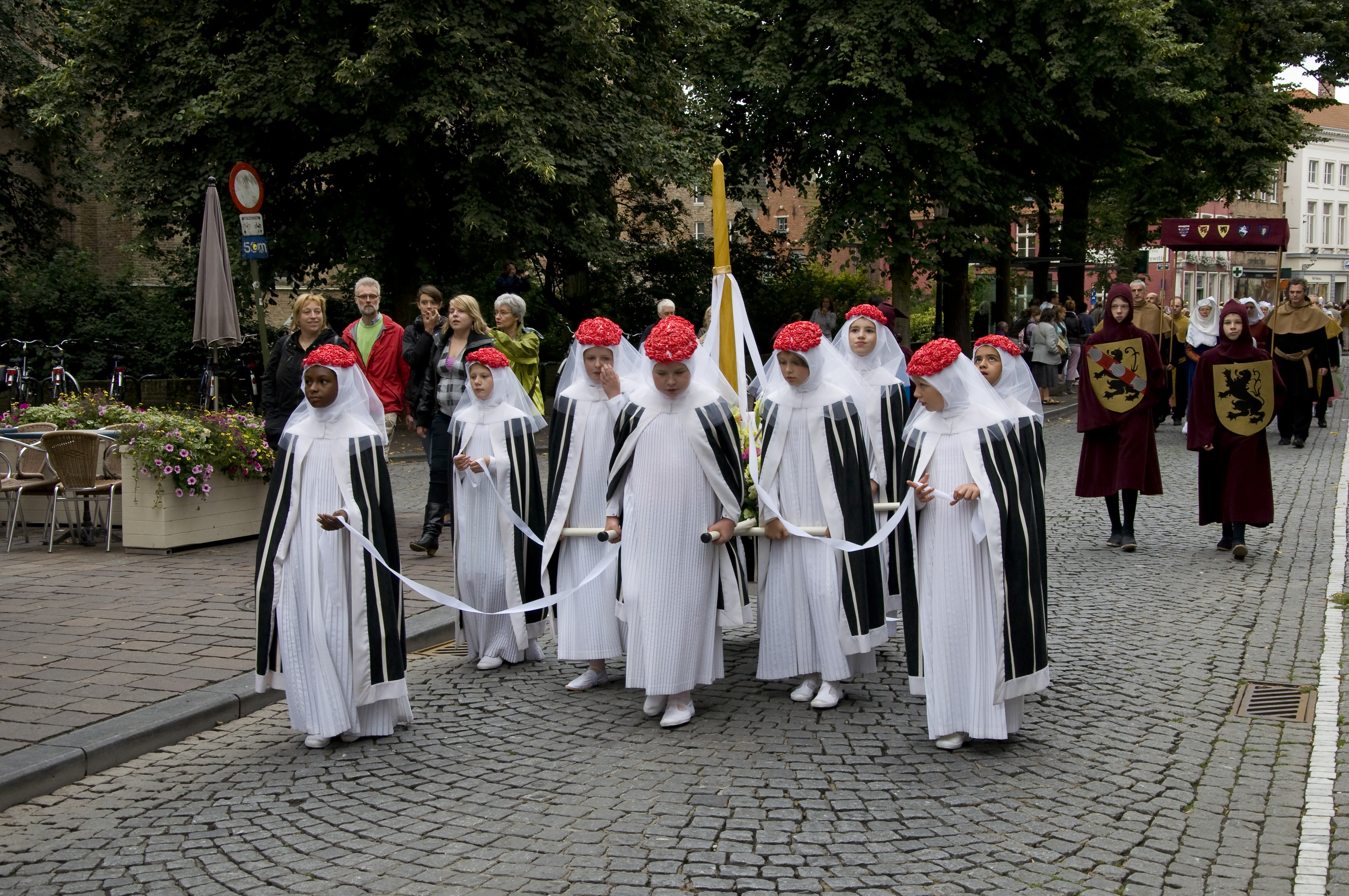
The candle

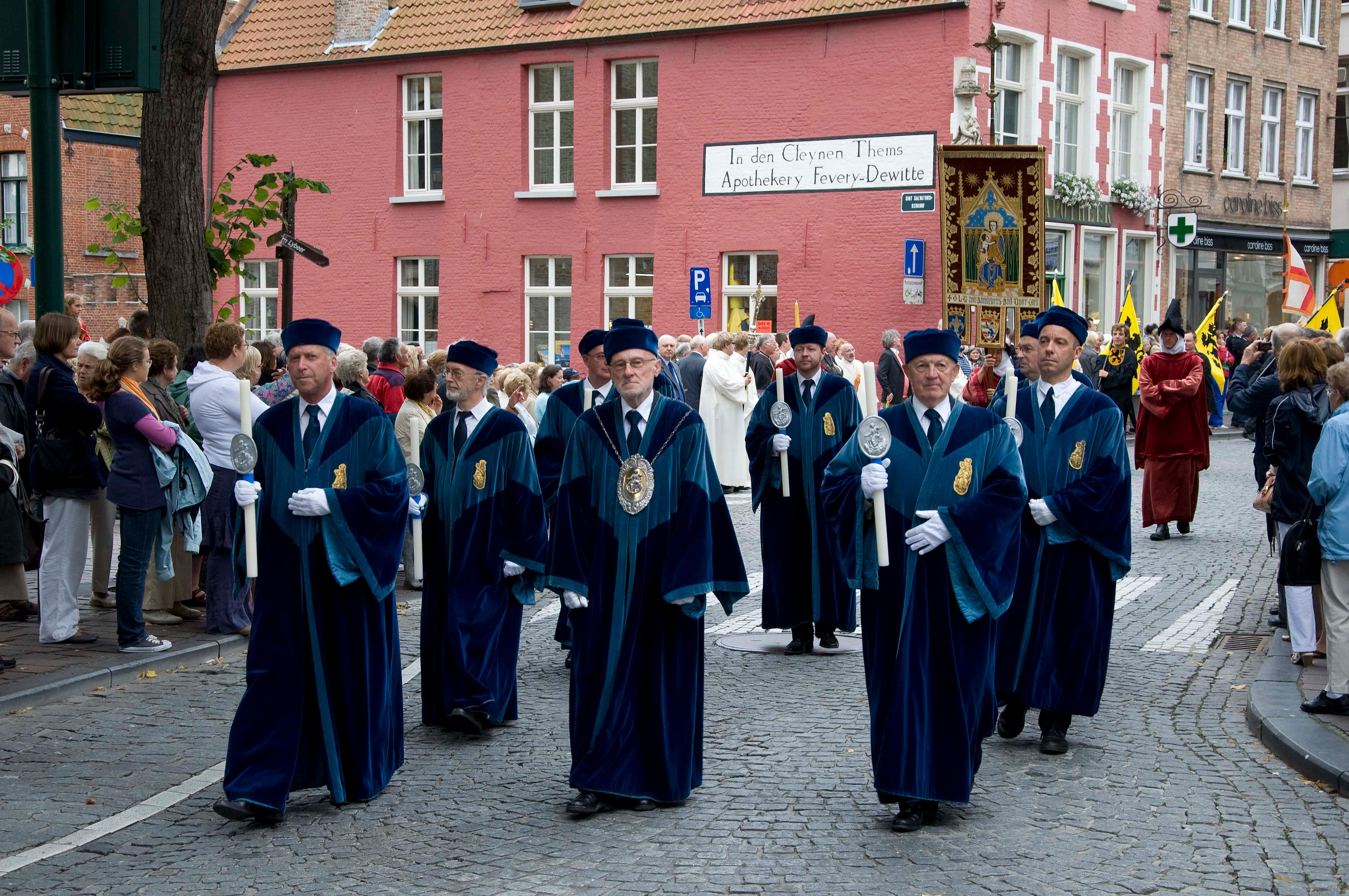
The Broederschap van Onze-Lieve-Vrouw van Blindekens during the Brugse Belofte 2010

The Brugse Belofte or Blindekens procession is a yearly Catholic procession held since 1305 in the Flemish city of Bruges (Brugge) on Assumption of Mary (15 August). In the summer of 1304 when the militia men from Bruges were called to fight the invading French army, their wives vowed to offer every year a thirty-six pound candle to Saint Mary if their husbands were to return home safely from the campaign. When after the battle of Mons-en-Pévèle most of the militia man returned safely, a procession was organized every year to the church of Saint Mary of the Blinds ( Dutch: Onze-Lieve-Vrouw-ter Potterie). Only between 1796 and 1838 the procession was cancelled. In the procession, the candle is carried by ten girls from Bruges.

== Bibliography ==
- De Maesschalck, Edward (2019). De Graven van Vlaanderen (861-1384) [The Counts of Flanders (861-1384)] (in Dutch) (2nd ed.). DavidsFonds / Standaard uitgeverij. ISBN 9789002268458.
- Verbruggen, J.F.; Falter, Rolf (2001). 1302 Opstand in Vlaanderen [1302 Revolt in Flanders] (in Dutch). Tielt: Lannoo. ISBN 9020944126.
