= Bruges =

Capital of West Flanders province, Belgium

Bruges: Brugge (Dutch)
- City and municipality
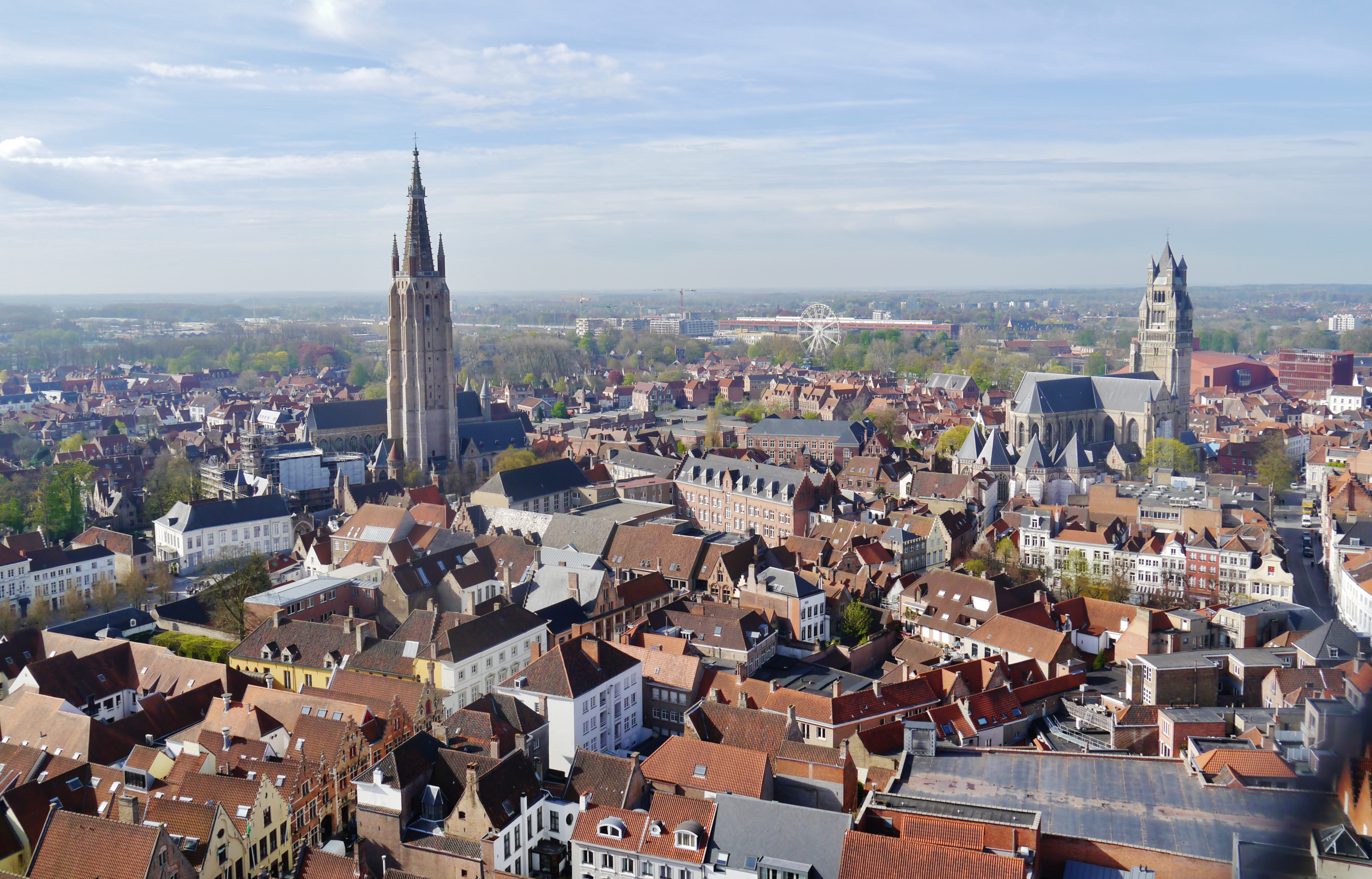
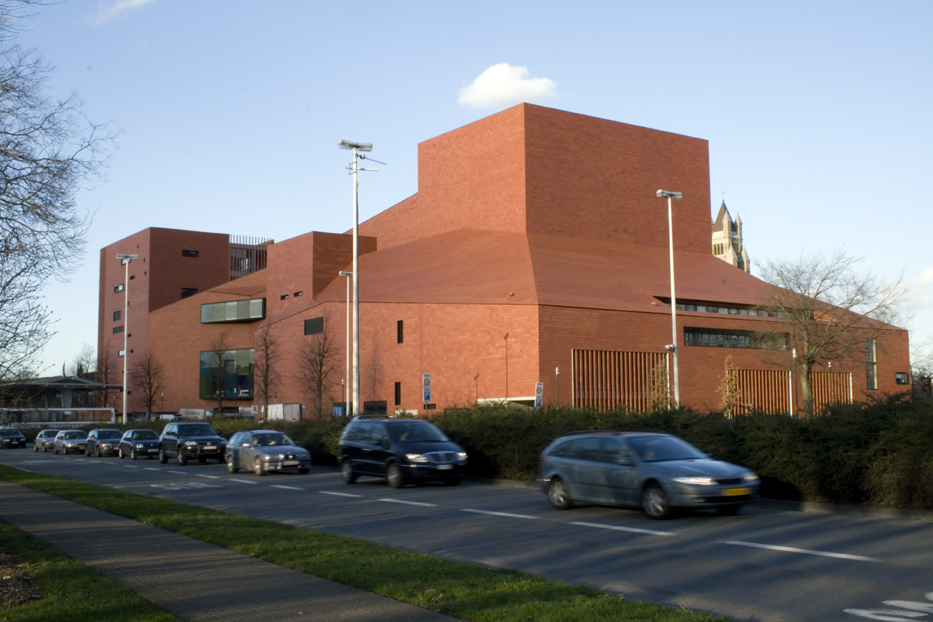
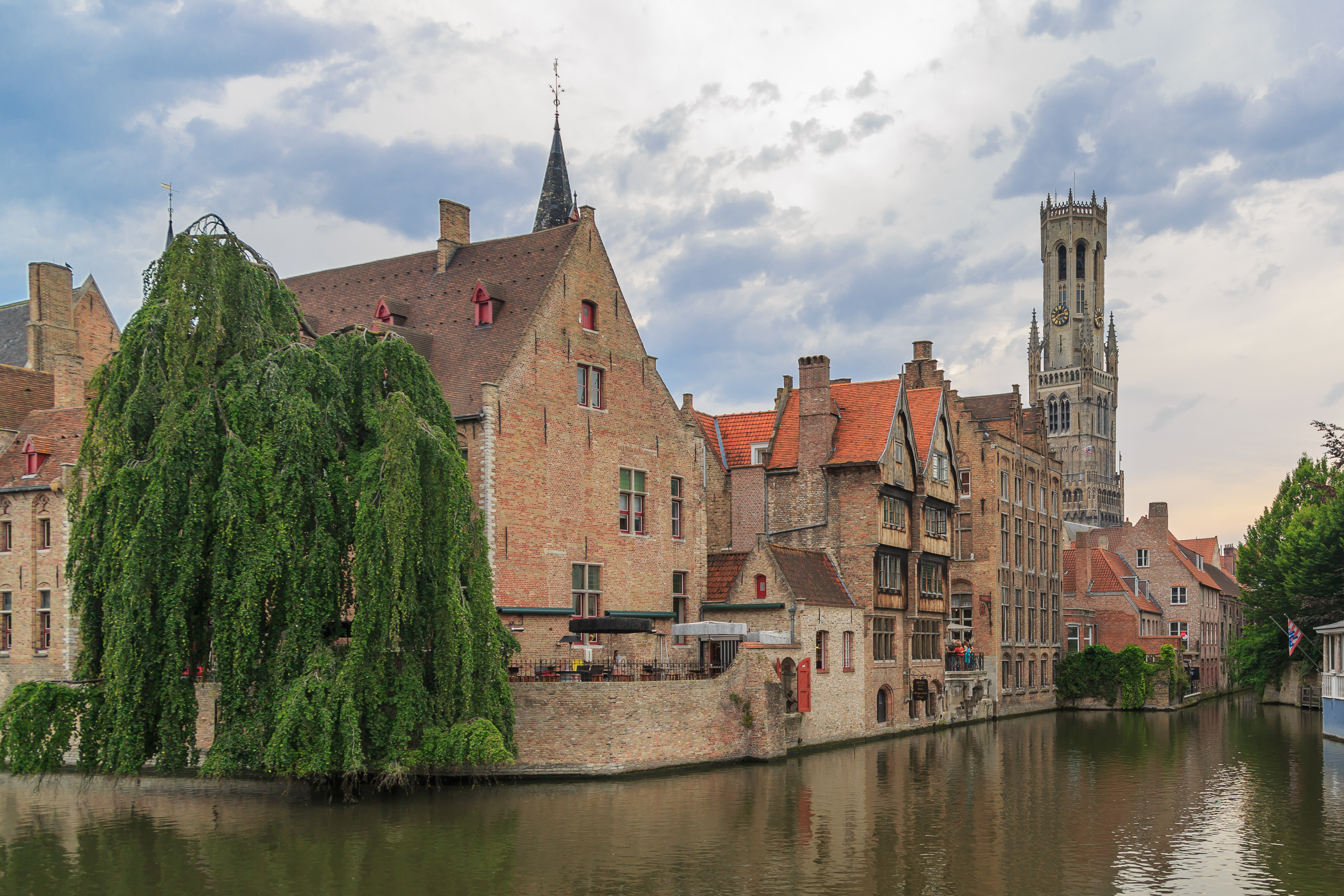
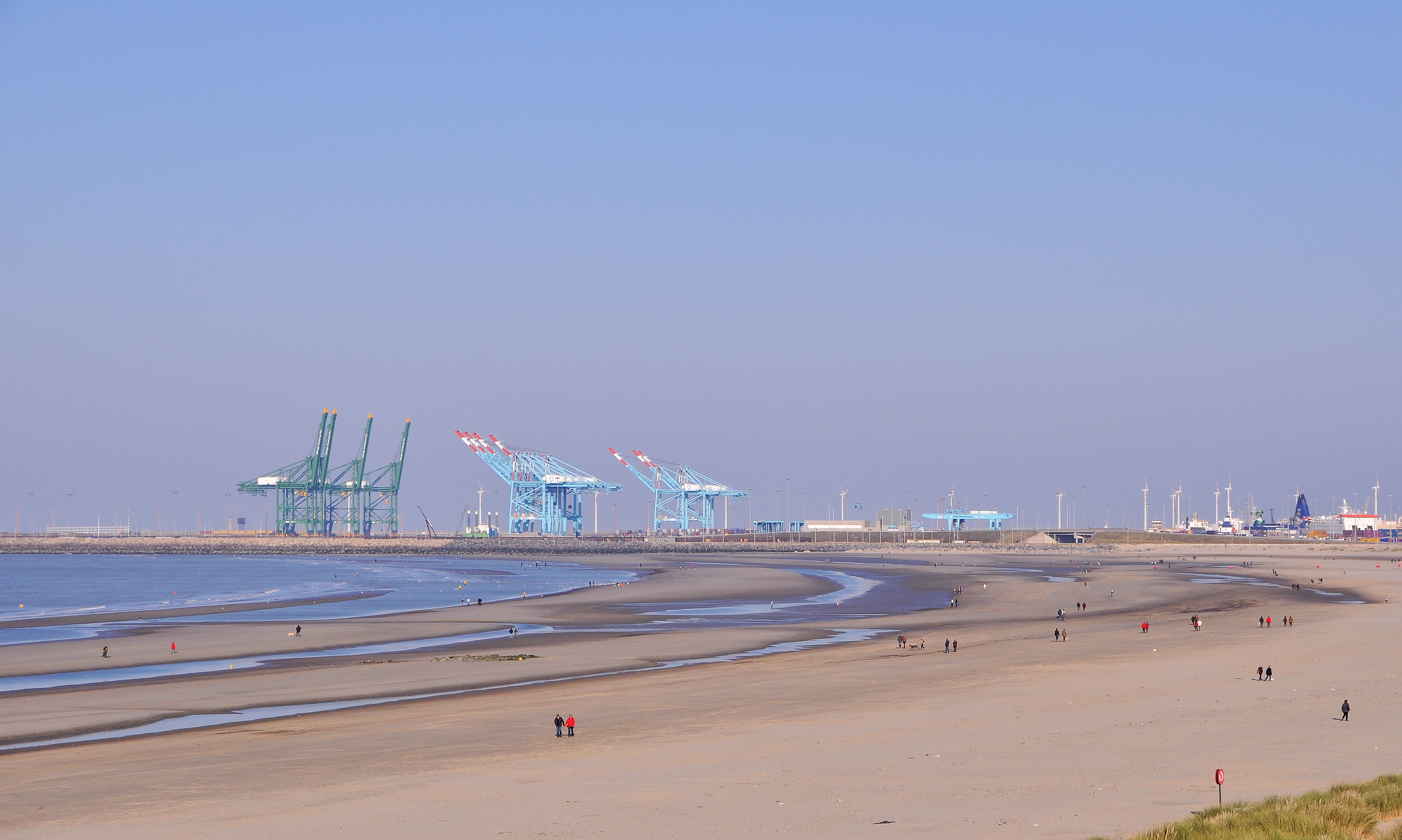
- View from the Belfry, with the Church of Our Lady and St. Salvator's Cathedral Concertgebouw Canal view Zeebrugge beach and outer port

- Flag Coat of arms

- Location of Bruges in West Flanders
- Interactive map of Bruges
- Location in Belgium
- Coordinates: 51°12′32″N 03°13′27″E
- Country: Belgium
- Community: Flemish Community
- Region: Flemish Region
- Province: West Flanders
- Arrondissement: Bruges

Government
  - Mayor: Dirk De fauw (CD&V)
  - Governing parties: CD&V, Vooruit, Open VLD

Area
  - Total: 140.99 km^{2} (54.44 sq mi)

Population (2022-01-01)
  - Total: 118,509
  - Density: 840.55/km^{2} (2,177.0/sq mi)
- Postal codes: 8000, 8200, 8310, 8380
- NIS code: 31005
- Area codes: 050
- Website: brugge.be

UNESCO World Heritage Site
- Official name: Historic Centre of Brugge
- Criteria: Cultural: (ii)(iv)(vi)
- Reference: 996
- Inscription: 2000 (24th Session)
- Area: 410 ha (1,000 acres)
- Buffer zone: 168 ha (420 acres)
- Logo of Brugge

Bruges (/bruːʒ/ BROOZH, French: [bʁyʒ]; Dutch: Brugge [ˈbrʏɣə]; West Flemish: Brugge [ˈbrœɦə]) is the capital and largest city of the province of West Flanders, in the Flemish Region of Belgium. It is located in the northwest of the country, and is the sixth most populous city in Belgium. The predominant language is Dutch (West Flemish).

The area of the whole city amounts to more than 14,099 hectares (140.99 km^{2}; 54.44 sq. miles), including 1,075 hectares off the coast, at Zeebrugge (from Brugge aan zee, meaning 'Bruges by the Sea'). The historic city center is a prominent World Heritage Site of UNESCO. It is oval and about 430 hectares in size. The city's total population is 120,669 (1 January 2006). The metropolitan area, including the outer commuter zone, covers an area of 616 km^{2} (238 sq mi) and had a total of 255,844 inhabitants as of 1 January 2008.

Along with a few other canal-based northern cities, such as Amsterdam and Saint Petersburg, it is sometimes referred to as the Venice of the North. Bruges has significant economic importance, thanks to its port, and was once one of the world's chief commercial cities. It is a major tourist destination within Belgium and is well-known as the seat of the College of Europe, a university institute for European studies.

== Toponymy ==
The earliest mention of the location's name is as Brugis in the Breviarium de thesauro Sancti Bavaris, an inventory of the Saint Bavo's Abbey compiled between 851-864 AD. The name Bruggas, Bruccas, Briuccas or Briuggas appears on coins minted between 864–875. This name resembles the Old Dutch for 'bridge': brugga, the Middle Dutch brucge or brugge and modern Dutch brug ('bridge'), but it is more likely derived from the Scandinavian 'Bryggja' which means 'Quay' or 'Jetty'.

Afterwards, it appears as Bruciam and Bruociam (892); as Brutgis uico (late ninth century); as in portu Bruggensi (c. 1010); as Bruggis (1012); as Bricge in the Anglo-Saxon Chronicle (1037); as Brugensis (1046); as Brycge in the Anglo-Saxon Chronicle (1049–1052); as Brugias (1072); as Bruges (1080–1085); as Bruggas (c. 1084); as Brugis (1089); and as Brugge (1116).

== History ==
=== Origins ===
Bruges was a location of coastal settlement during prehistory. This Bronze Age and Iron Age settlement are unrelated to medieval city development. In the Bruges area, the first fortifications were built after Julius Caesar's conquest of the Menapii in the first century BC, to protect the coastal area against pirates. The Franks took over the whole region from the Gallo-Romans around the fourth century and administered it as the Pagus Flandrensis. The Viking incursions of the ninth century prompted Count Baldwin I of Flanders to reinforce the Roman fortifications. Whilst the Viking raids led to the decline of Dorestad, Quentovic and Domburg as harbors for trade with England, the Baltic Sea area and Scandinavia, Bruges was able to fill that gap. Early medieval habitation starts in the ninth and tenth centuries on the Burgh terrain, probably with a fortified settlement and church. Bruges gained some fame as destination for pilgrimage, when the relics of Saint Donatian of Reims were brought to the town and venerated in the St. Donatian's church. Saint Donatian became the patron saint of Bruges.

Bruges was described for the first time in the Encomium Emmae Reginae, written around 1042. The Enconium mentioned how Emma of Normandy, the queen dowager of England, which was exiled during the struggle for the succession of her husband Cnut, was received in 1036 by Baldwin V of Flanders in Bruges. This document described Bruges as a town full of merchants and diverse products, and where ships had direct access to sea.

=== Golden age (12th–15th centuries) ===
In 1089, Bruges became the capital of the County of Flanders. Bruges received its city charter on 27 July 1128, and new walls and canals were built. By the 12th century, the city had gained an autonomous administration. Het Zwin (Golden Inlet), the tidal inlet of Bruges, was crucial to the development of local commerce. Since about 1050, gradual silting had caused the city to lose its direct access to the sea. A storm in 1134, however, re-established this access, through the creation of a natural channel at the Zwin. The new sea arm stretched to Damme, a city that became the commercial outpost for Bruges.

Bruges had a strategic location at the crossroads of the northern Hanseatic League trade, who had a kontor in the city, and the southern trade routes. Bruges was already included in the circuit of the Flemish and French cloth fairs at the beginning of the 13th century, but when the old system of fairs broke down, the entrepreneurs of Bruges innovated. They developed, or borrowed from Italy, new forms of merchant capitalism, whereby several merchants would share the risks and profits and pool their knowledge of markets. They employed new forms of economic exchange, including bills of exchange (i.e. promissory notes) and letters of credit. The city eagerly welcomed foreign traders, most notably the Portuguese traders selling pepper and other spices.

With the reawakening of town life in the 12th century, a wool market, a woolens weaving industry, and the cloth market all profited from the shelter of city walls, where surpluses could be safely accumulated under the patronage of the counts of Flanders. The city's entrepreneurs reached out to make economic colonies of England and Scotland's wool-producing districts. English contacts brought Normandy grain and Gascon wines. Hanseatic ships filled the harbor, which had to be expanded beyond Damme to Sluys to accommodate the new cog-ships.

In 1277, the first merchant fleet from the Republic of Genoa appeared in the port of Bruges, the first of the merchant colony that made Bruges the main link to the trade of the Mediterranean. This development opened not only the trade in spices from the Levant but also advanced commercial and financial techniques and a flood of capital that soon took over the banking of Bruges.

The Bourse opened in 1309 (most likely the first stock exchange in the world) and developed into the most sophisticated money market of the Low Countries in the 14th century. By the time Venetian galleys first appeared, in 1314, they were latecomers. Numerous foreign merchants were welcomed in Bruges, such as the Castilian wool merchants who first arrived in the 13th century. After the Castilian wool monopoly ended, the Basques, many hailing from Bilbao (Biscay), thrived as merchants (wool, iron commodities, etc.) and established their own commercial consulate in Bruges by the mid-15th century. The foreign merchants expanded the city's trading zones. They maintained separate communities governed by their own laws until the economic collapse after 1700.

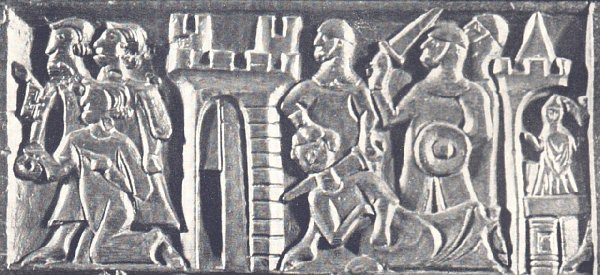
Contemporary depiction of the Bruges Matins on the Oxford Chest.

At the start of the Franco-Flemish War in 1297, Bruges was sympathetic to the French cause and surrendered eagerly to the French king. The French army fortified the city with a second, seven kilometer long city wall, which enclosed 430 ha (1,100 acres). The French governor Jacques de Châtillon imposed harsh measures and taxes on Bruges, which ignated a rebellion. On 18 May 1302 during the Bruges Matins the local militia massacred the French garrison. Bruges, together with other Flemish towns, joined forces with the Count of Flanders against the French, culminating in the unexpected victory at the Battle of the Golden Spurs, fought near Kortrijk on 11 July. The statue of Jan Breydel and Pieter de Coninck, the leaders of the uprising, can still be seen on the Big Market square.

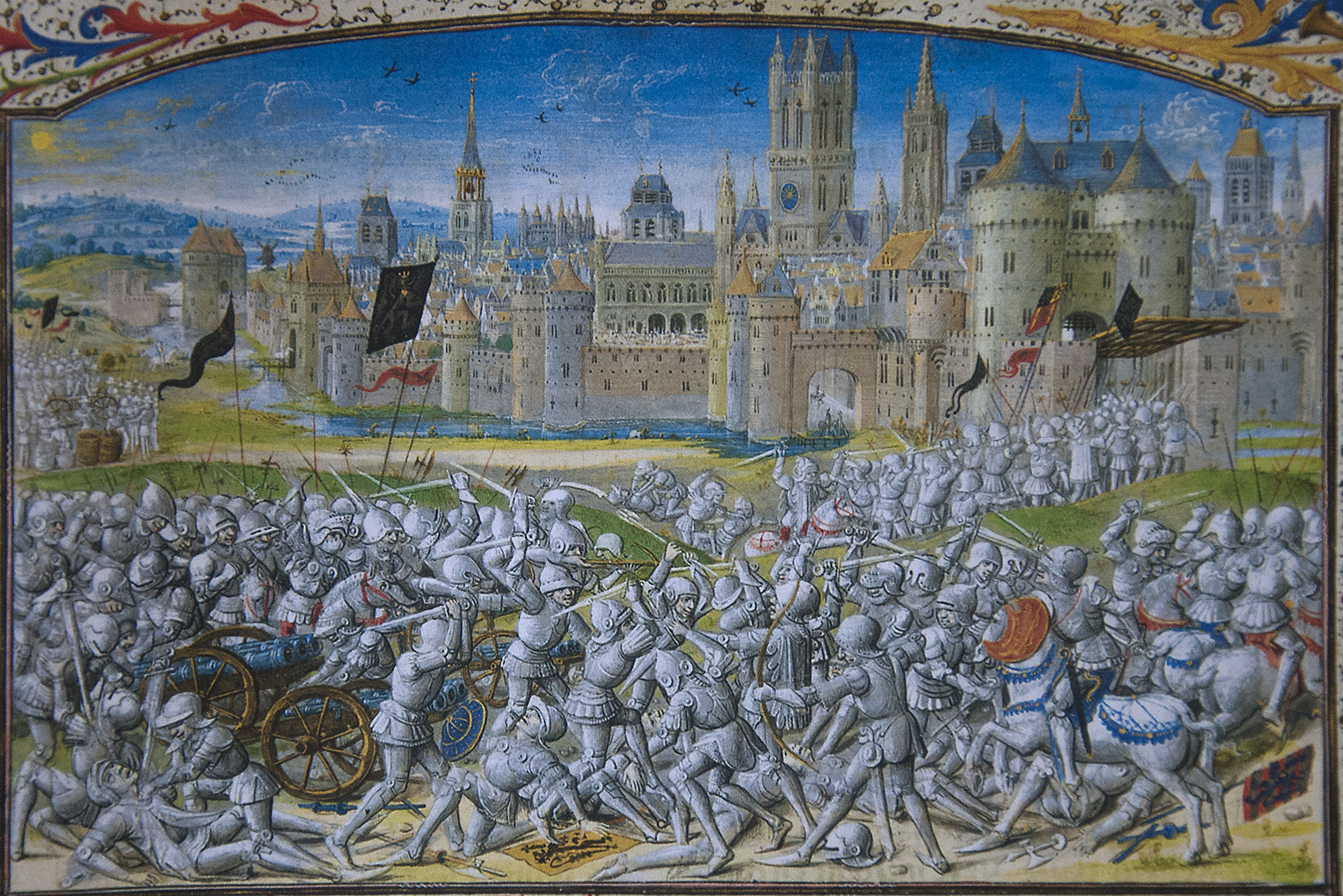
The Battle of Beverhoutsveld (1382) in Froissart's Chronicles, with Bruges as setting

The city maintained a militia as a permanent paramilitary body. It gained flexibility and high prestige through close ties to a guild of the organized militia, comprising professionals and specialized units. Militia men bought and maintained their own weapons and armor, according to their family status and wealth.

Later, Bruges would be consumed in the Flemish revolts that occurred around the County of Flanders between 1323 and 1328. The weavers and spinners of Bruges were thought to be the best in the world, and the population of Bruges grew to at least 46,000 inhabitants at this time around 1350. At the end of the 14th century, Bruges became one of the Four Members, along with Brugse Vrije, Ghent, and Ypres. Together they formed a parliament; however, they frequently quarreled amongst themselves.

In the 15th century, Philip the Good, Duke of Burgundy, set up a court in Bruges, as well as Brussels and Lille, attracting several artists, bankers, and other prominent personalities from all over Europe. The new oil-painting techniques of the Flemish school gained world renown. The first book in English ever printed was published in Bruges by William Caxton. Edward IV and Richard III of England were then living in exile in Bruges.

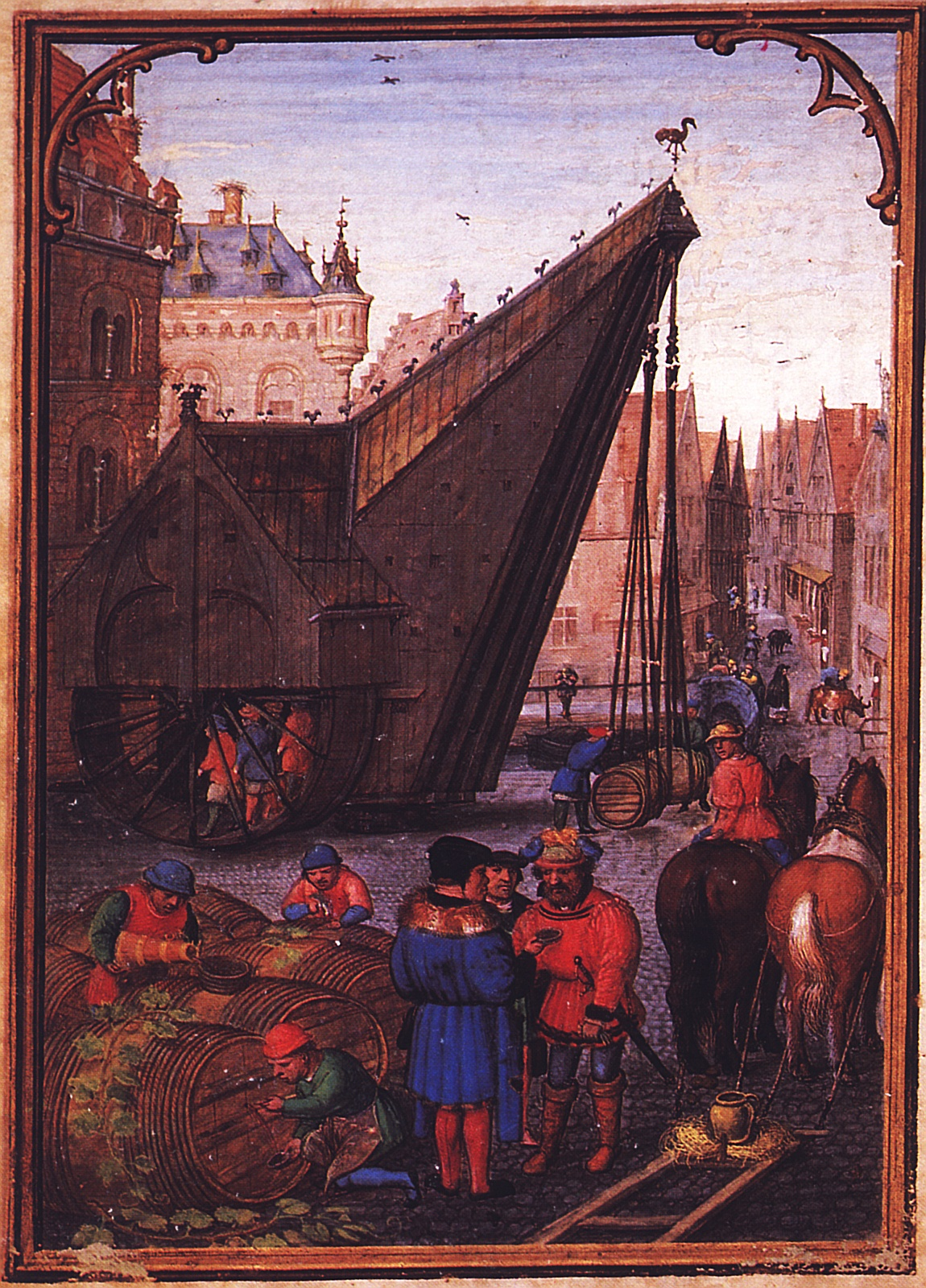
Merchants in Bruges, first half of the 16th century

=== Decline after 1500 ===
Starting around 1500, the Zwin channel, (the Golden Inlet) which had given the city its prosperity, began silting up and the Golden Era ended. In the 16th century, Bruges was a centre of humanism and Protestantism, with international ramifications. In 1578, the city briefly came under Protestant rule. The execution of three Franciscan friars on the Burg caused a great stir. The secession of the Spanish Netherlands in 1584 led to the city's final decline, which soon fell behind Antwerp as the economic flagship of the Low Countries.

During the 17th century, the lace industry took off, and various efforts to bring back the glorious past were made. During the 1650s, the city was the base for Charles II of England and his court in exile. The maritime infrastructure was modernized, and new connections with the sea were built, but without much success, as Antwerp became increasingly dominant. Bruges became impoverished and gradually faded in importance.

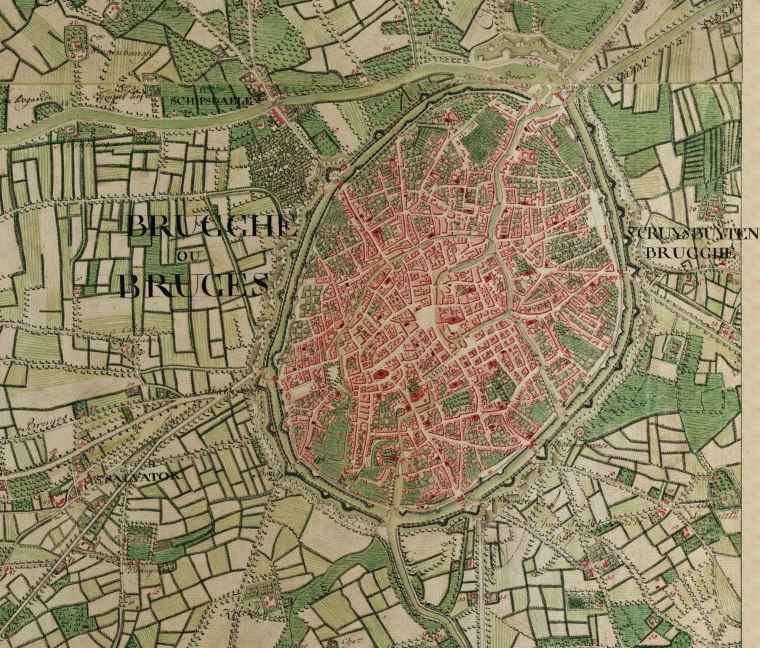
Bruges on the Ferraris map, c. 1775

=== 19th century and later revival ===
In the second half of the 19th century, Bruges became one of the world's first tourist destinations, attracting wealthy British and French tourists. By 1909, the 'Bruges Forward: Society to Improve Tourist' association had come into operation.

The symbolist novelist George Rodenbach made the city into a character in his novel Bruges-la-Morte, meaning "Bruges-the-dead", which was adapted into Erich Wolfgang Korngold's opera, Die tote Stadt (The Dead City).

In World War I, German forces occupied Bruges. However, despite being a base for the Flanders U-boat flotilla, the city suffered virtually no damage, and was liberated on 19 October 1918 by the Allies. The city was occupied by the Germans from 1940 during World War II and was again spared destruction. On 12 September 1944, it was liberated by the 12th Manitoba Dragoons' Canadian troops.

After 1965, the original medieval city experienced a "renaissance". Restorations of residential and commercial structures, historic monuments, and churches generated a surge in tourism and economic activity in the downtown area. International tourism has boomed, and new efforts resulted in Bruges being designated European Capital of Culture in 2002. It attracts some eight million tourists annually.

The port of Zeebrugge was built in 1907. The Germans used it for their U-boats in World War I. It was greatly expanded in the 1970s and early 1980s and has become one of Europe's most important and modern ports.

== Geography ==
Municipality of Bruges

The municipality comprises the following sub-municipalities:

- The historic city centre of Bruges, Sint-Jozef and Sint-Pieters (I)
- Koolkerke (II)
- Sint-Andries (III)
- Sint-Michiels (IV)
- Assebroek (V)
- Sint-Kruis (VI)
- Dudzele (VII)
- Lissewege (with Zeebrugge and Zwankendamme) (VIII)

=== Climate ===
Bruges has an oceanic climate (Köppen: Cfb).

== Landmarks, arts, and culture ==
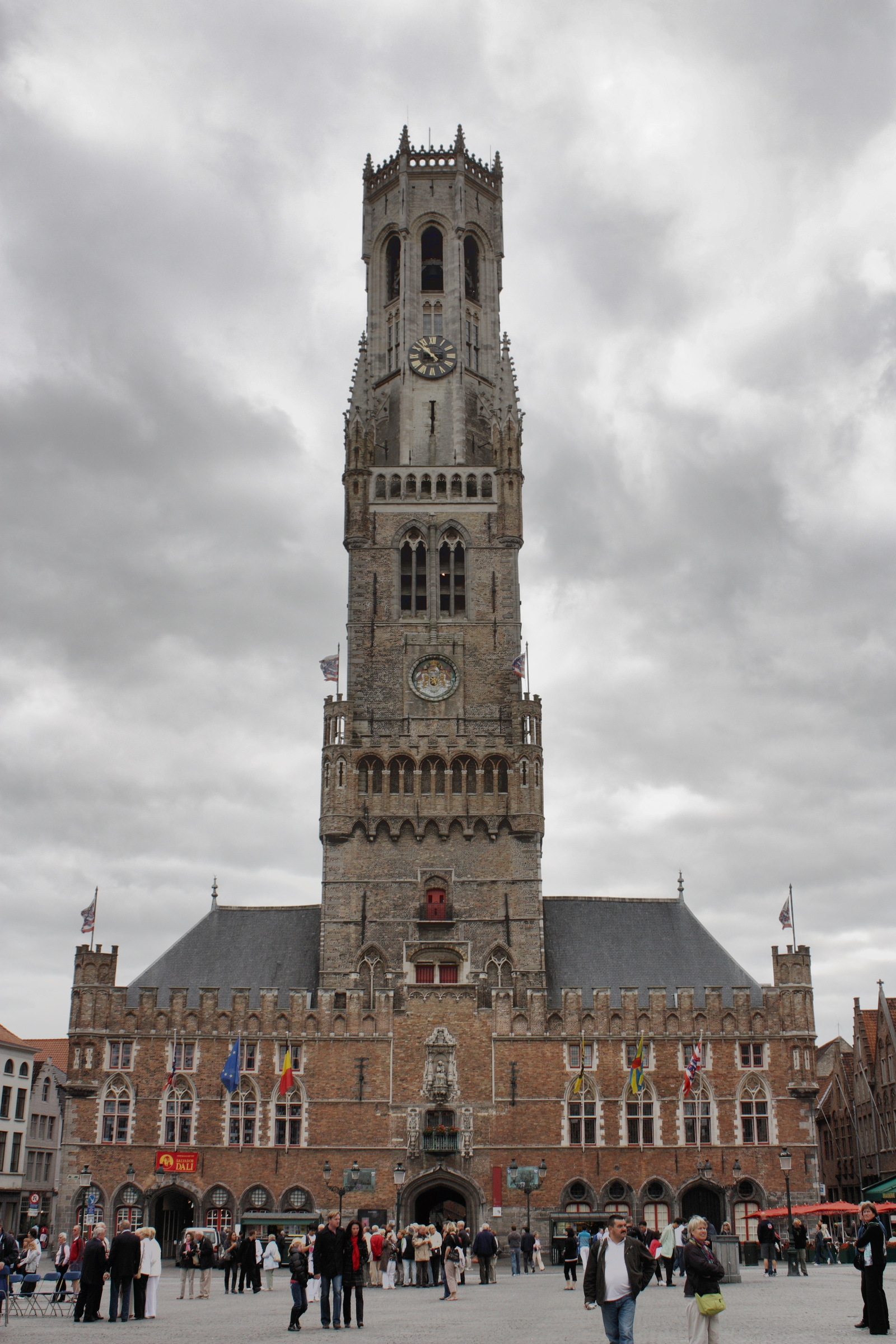
The Belfry of Bruges, a UNESCO World Heritage Site

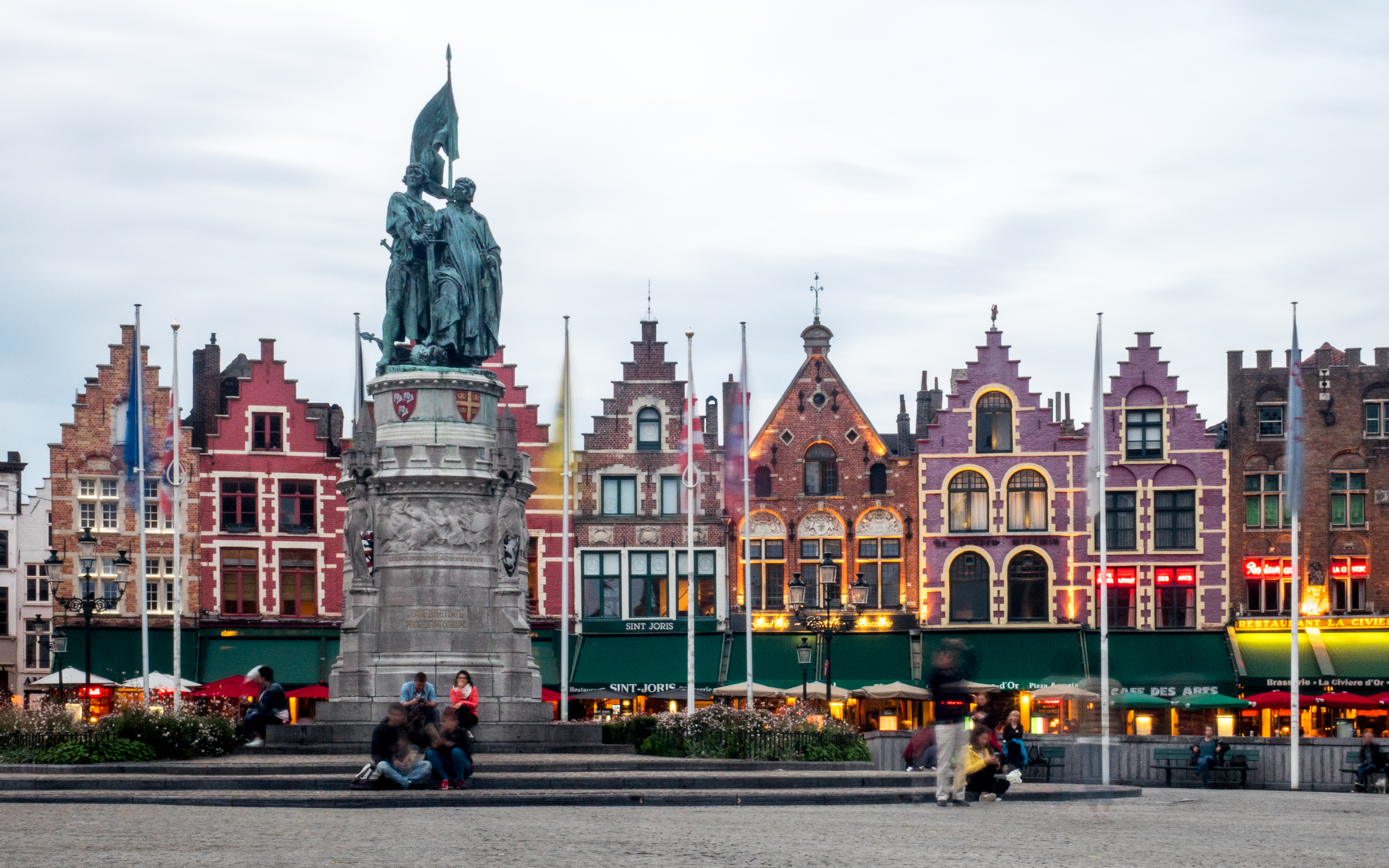
The Markt (market square)

Climate data for Bruges (1991–2020 normals)
Month	Jan	Feb	Mar	Apr	May	Jun	Jul	Aug	Sep	Oct	Nov	Dec	Year
Mean daily maximum °C (°F)	6.8 (44.2)	7.7 (45.9)	10.8 (51.4)	14.5 (58.1)	17.6 (63.7)	20.3 (68.5)	22.5 (72.5)	22.7 (72.9)	19.7 (67.5)	15.3 (59.5)	10.5 (50.9)	7.3 (45.1)	14.7 (58.5)
Daily mean °C (°F)	4.2 (39.6)	4.6 (40.3)	7.0 (44.6)	9.8 (49.6)	13.2 (55.8)	16.1 (61.0)	18.1 (64.6)	18.1 (64.6)	15.3 (59.5)	11.6 (52.9)	7.7 (45.9)	4.8 (40.6)	10.9 (51.6)
Mean daily minimum °C (°F)	1.6 (34.9)	1.4 (34.5)	3.2 (37.8)	5.1 (41.2)	8.8 (47.8)	11.8 (53.2)	13.7 (56.7)	13.5 (56.3)	10.9 (51.6)	8.0 (46.4)	4.8 (40.6)	2.3 (36.1)	7.1 (44.8)
Average precipitation mm (inches)	69.3 (2.73)	62.2 (2.45)	53.5 (2.11)	42.6 (1.68)	58.8 (2.31)	66.1 (2.60)	76.9 (3.03)	86.4 (3.40)	81.0 (3.19)	84.9 (3.34)	92.3 (3.63)	94.9 (3.74)	868.8 (34.20)
Average precipitation days (≥ 1.0 mm)	12.6	11.4	10.4	9.2	9.7	9.6	10.1	10.5	10.4	12.4	14.2	14.6	134.9
Mean monthly sunshine hours	67	87	145	202	229	228	232	218	168	121	69	55	1,821
Source: Royal Meteorological Institute

The medieval architecture in Bruges is mostly intact, making it one of the best-preserved medieval towns in Europe. The "Historic Centre of Bruges" has been a UNESCO World Heritage Site since 2000. Its medieval buildings include the Church of Our Lady, whose brick spire reaches 115.6 m (379.27 ft), making it the world's second-highest brick tower/building. The sculpture Madonna and Child, which can be seen in the transept, is believed to be the only of Michelangelo's sculptures to have left Italy within his lifetime.

Bruges' best-known landmark is the Belfry of Bruges, a 13th-century belfry housing a municipal carillon comprising 47 bells. The Belfry of Bruges, independent of the previously mentioned UNESCO World Heritage Site in Bruges, is included on the World Heritage Site of Belfries of Belgium and France. The city still employs a full-time carillonneur, who gives free concerts regularly.

In addition to the "Historic Centre of Bruges" and the tower included in the "Belfries of Belgium and France", Bruges is also home to a third UNESCO World Heritage Site; the Ten Wijngaerde Beguinage, a beguinage built in the 13th century, is included in the World Heritage Site of "Flemish Beguinages".

=== Craft ===
Bruges is known for its lace, a textile technique. Moreover, the city and its lace would go on to inspire the Thread Routes film series, the second episode of which, shot in 2011, was partly set in Bruges.

Several beers are named after the city, such as Brugge Blond, Brugge Tripel, Brugs, Brugse Babbelaar, Brugse Straffe Hendrik, and Brugse Zot. However, only the latter two—Brugse Zot and Brugse Straffe Hendrik—are brewed in the city itself, in the De Halve Maan Brewery.

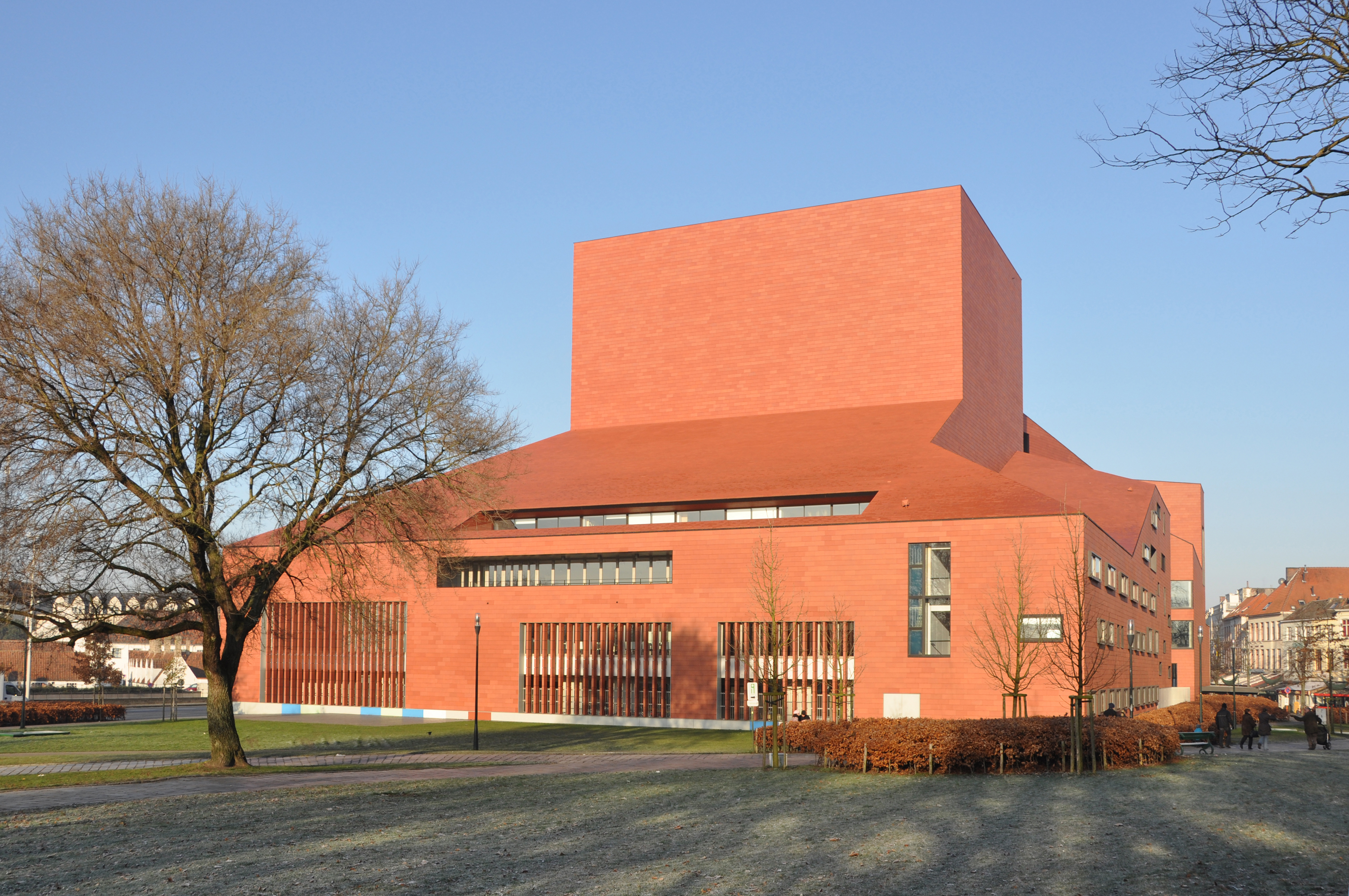
Concertgebouw ("Concert Building")

=== Entertainment ===
- Aquariustheater
- Boudewijn Seapark (an amusement park in Sint-Michiels)
- Biekorf
- Cinema Liberty
- Cinema Lumière (alternative movies)
- Concertgebouw
- De Dijk
- De Werf
- Het Entrepot
- Joseph Ryelandtzaal
- Kinepolis Bruges
- Magdalenazaal
- Sirkeltheater
- Stadsschouwburg Brugge
- Studio Hall

=== Museums and historic sites (non-religious) ===
Bruges is home to a number of museums. Its art museums include the Arents House, as well as the Groeningemuseum, which has an extensive collection of medieval and early modern art. Members of the 15th century Early Netherlandish school of painters are represented, including works by Jan van Eyck. Van Eyck, as well as Hans Memling, lived and worked in Bruges.

The preserved old city gateways are the Kruispoort, the Gentpoort, the Smedenpoort and the Ezelpoort. The Dampoort, the Katelijnepoort and the Boeveriepoort are no longer present.

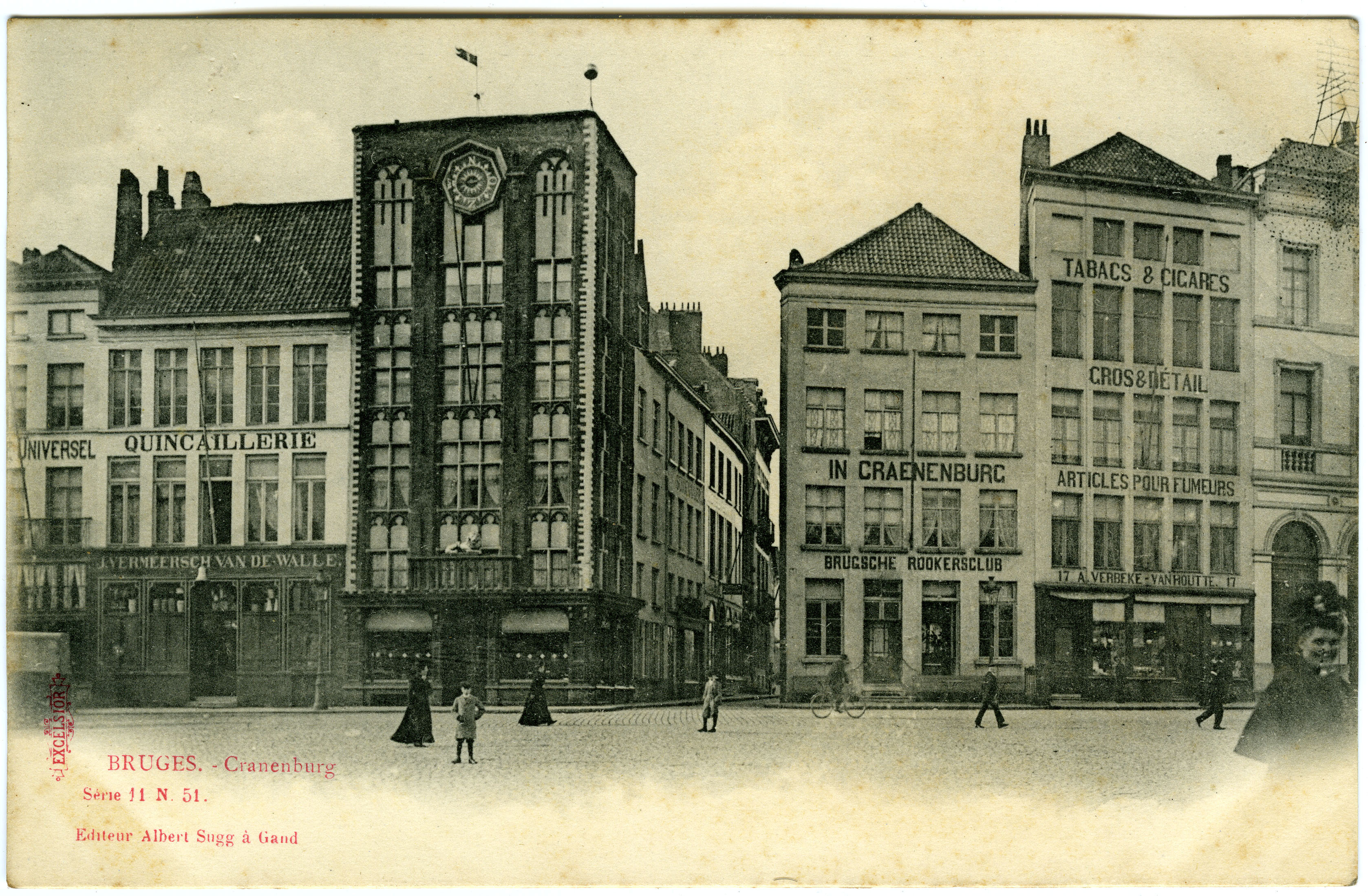
Postcard showing the Cranenburg House

The Old St. John's Hospital (Hans Memling museum) and Our Lady of the Potteries are Hospital museums. The city is known for Musea Brugge, the general name for a group of 13 different historical museums in the city, including:

- Gruuthusemuseum, a museum for the house of Louis de Gruuthuse.
- Archaeological Museum
- Gentpoort
- Belfry
- City Hall on the Burg (Bruges) square
- Provinciaal Hof (Provincial Court)
- Manor of the Brugse Vrije
- Museum of Folklore
- Guido Gezelle Museum
- Koelewei (Cool Meadow) Mill
- Sint-Janshuis (St. John's House) Mill

Bruges' non-municipal museums include the Brewery Museum, Hof Bladelin, Choco-Story (chocolate museum), Lumina Domestica (lamp museum), Museum-Gallery Xpo: Salvador Dalí, Diamond Museum, Frietmuseum (a museum dedicated to Belgian fries, located in the fomer house of the Genoese Republic), Historium (museum of the medieval history of Bruges), Lace centre, St. George's Archers Guild, St. Sebastian's Archers’ Guild, St. Trudo Abbey, and the Public Observatory Beisbroek.

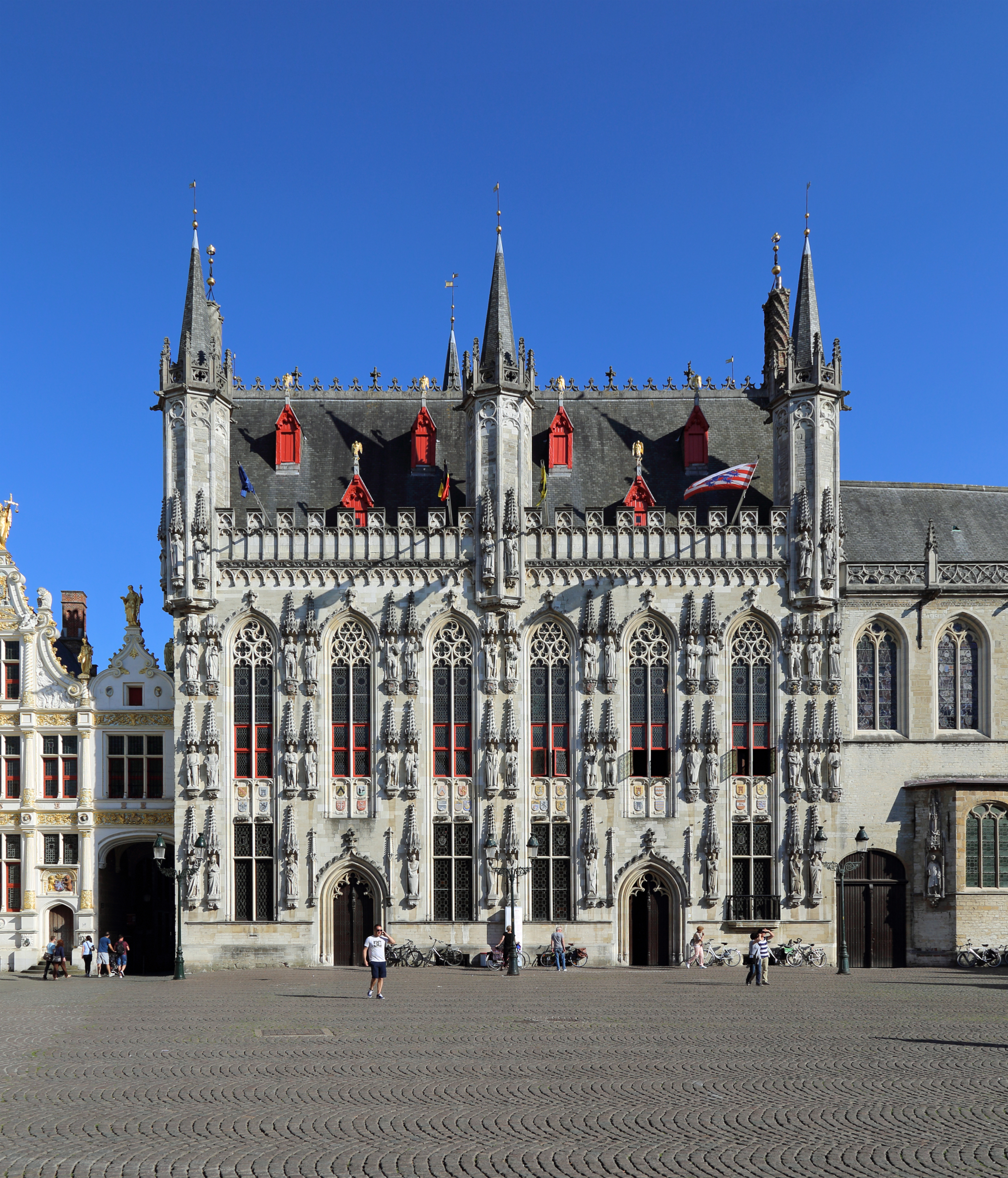
The City Hall

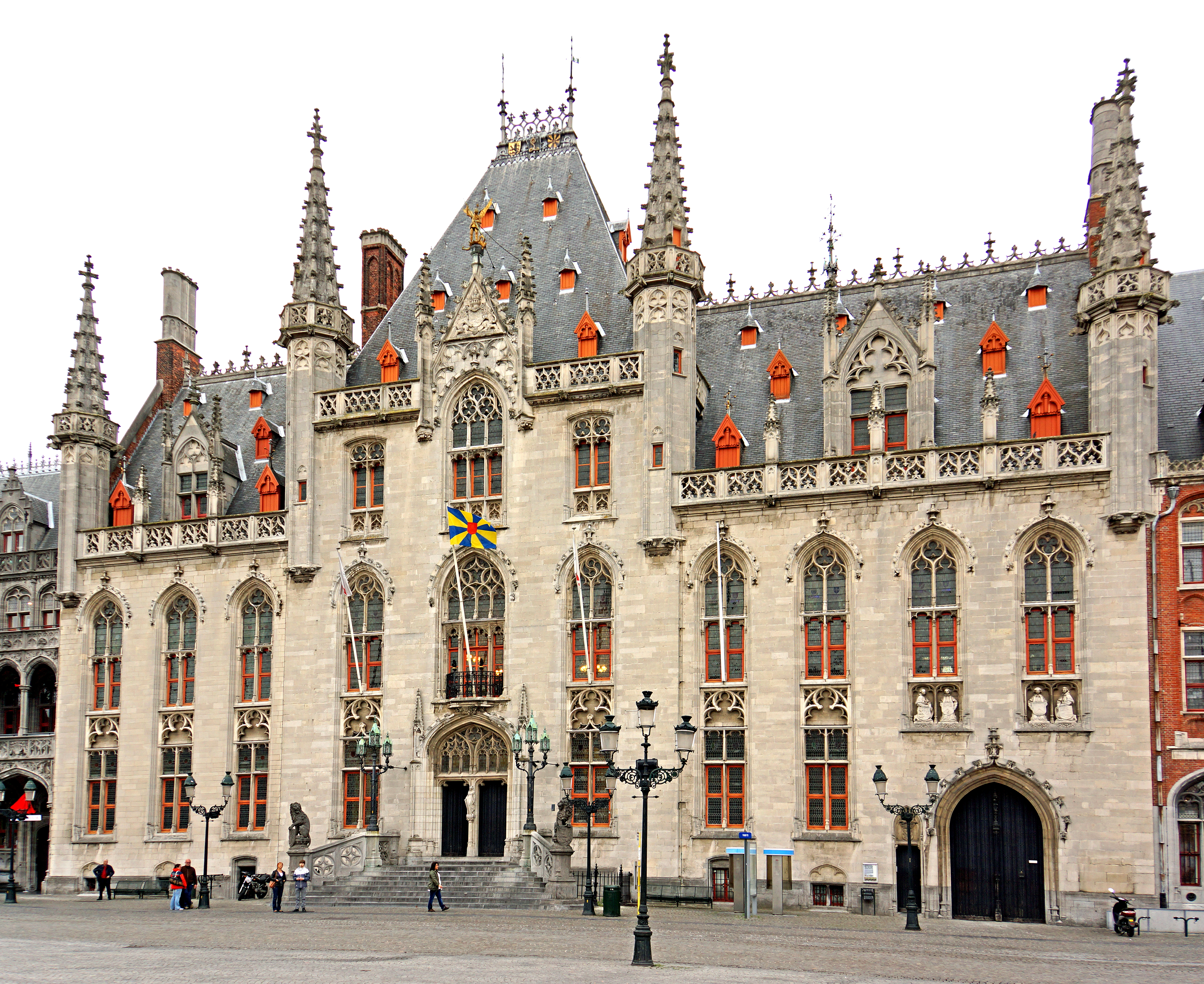
The Provinciaal Hof

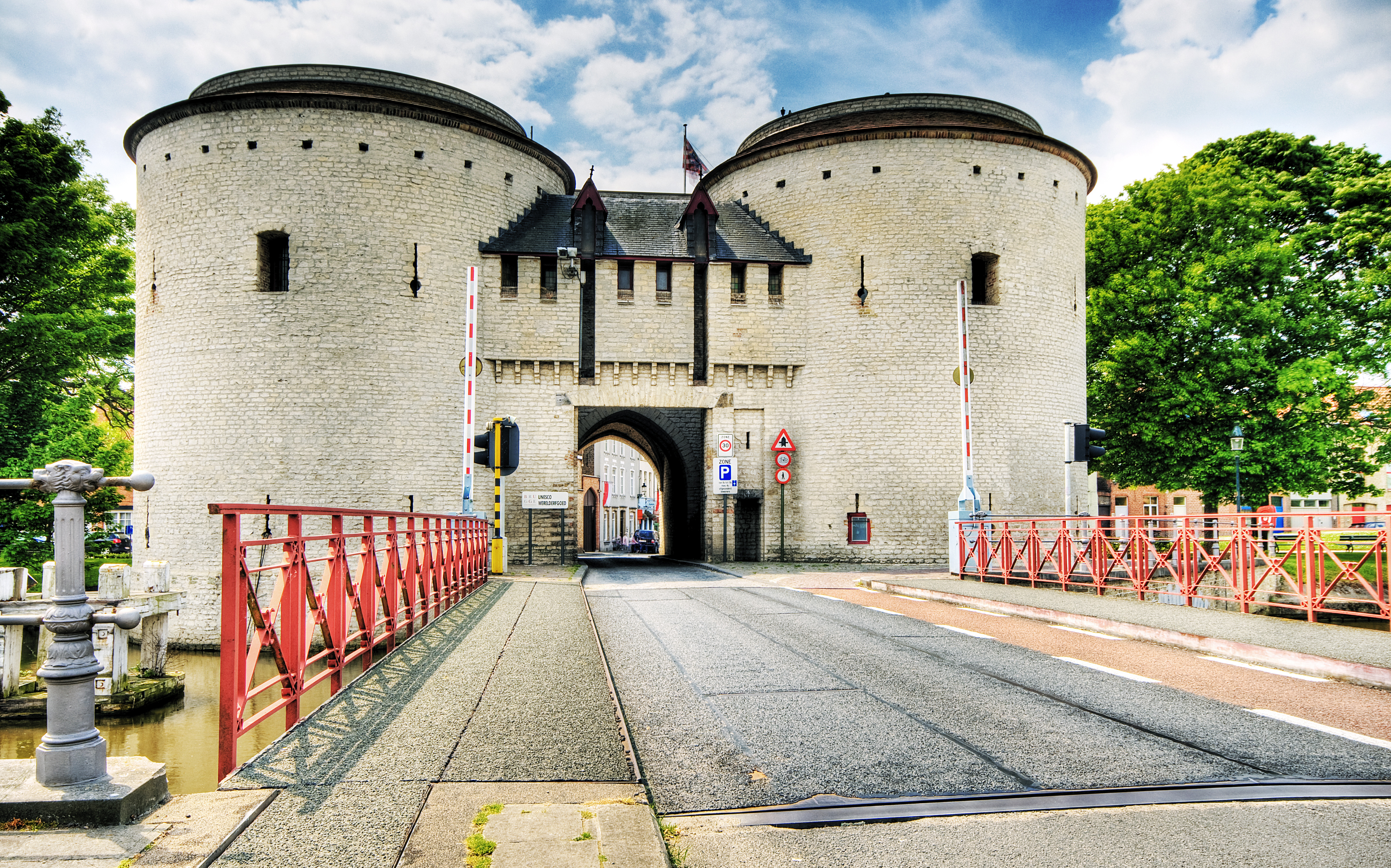
The Kruispoort

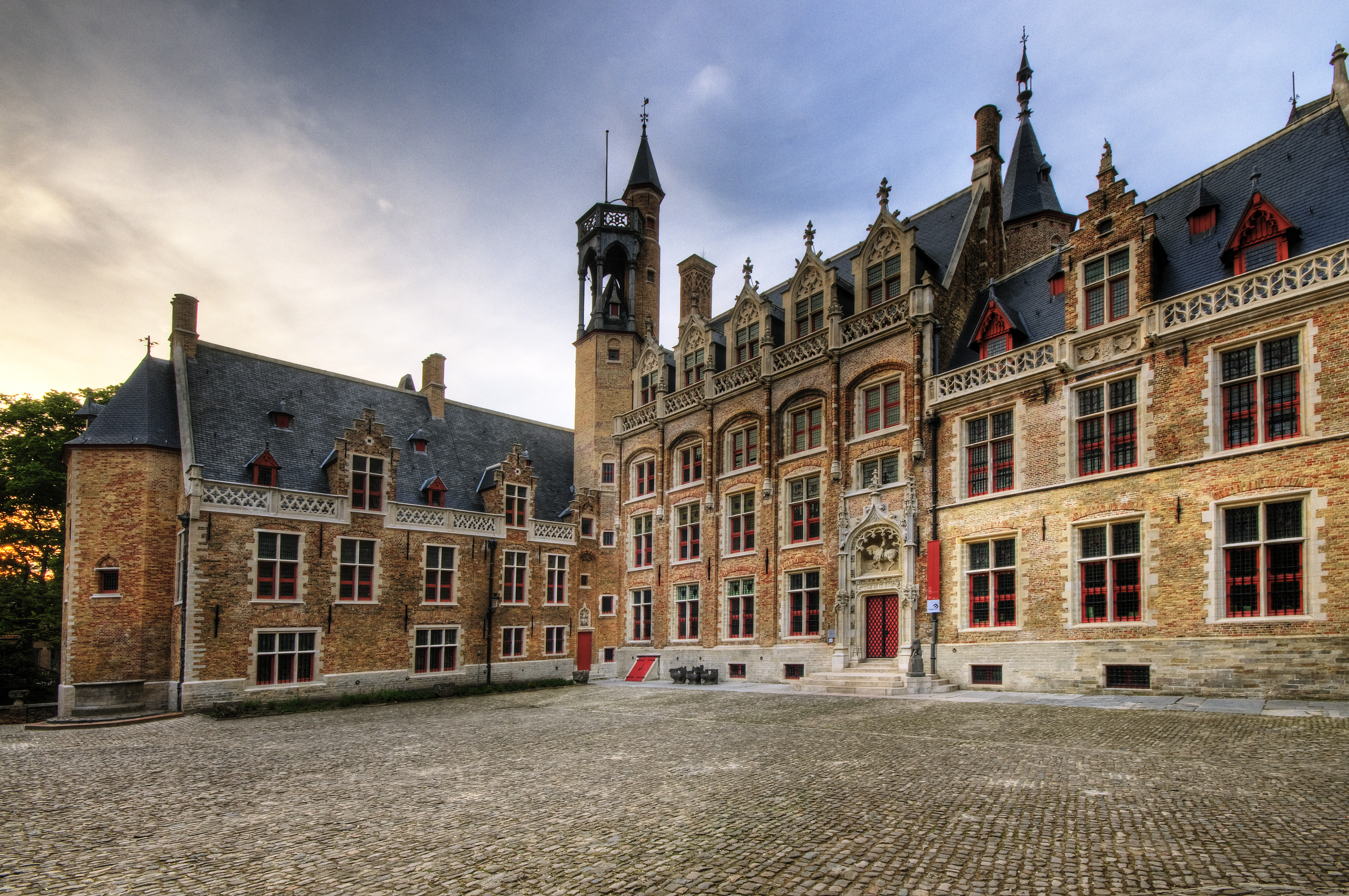
Gruuthusemuseum

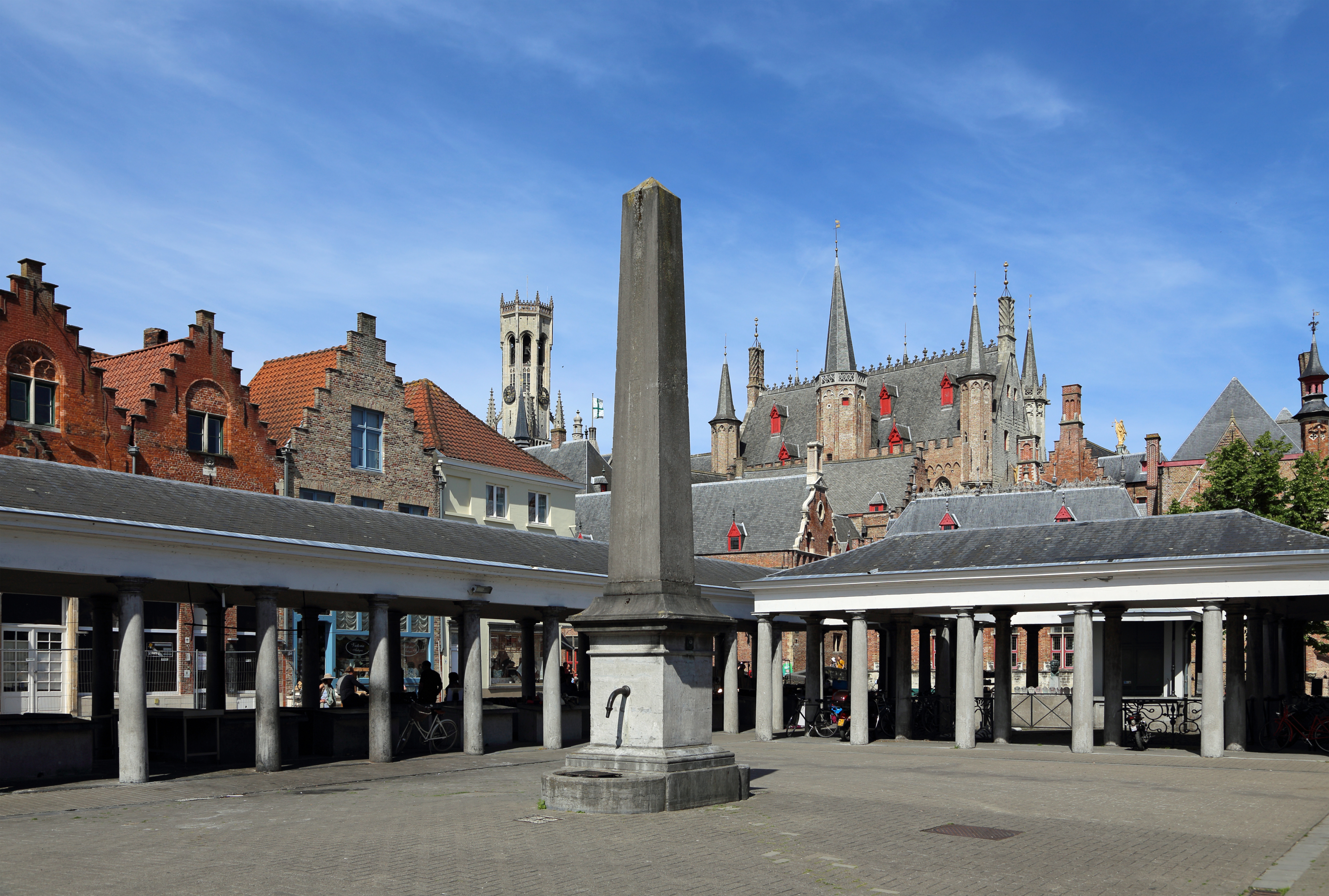
The Fish Market

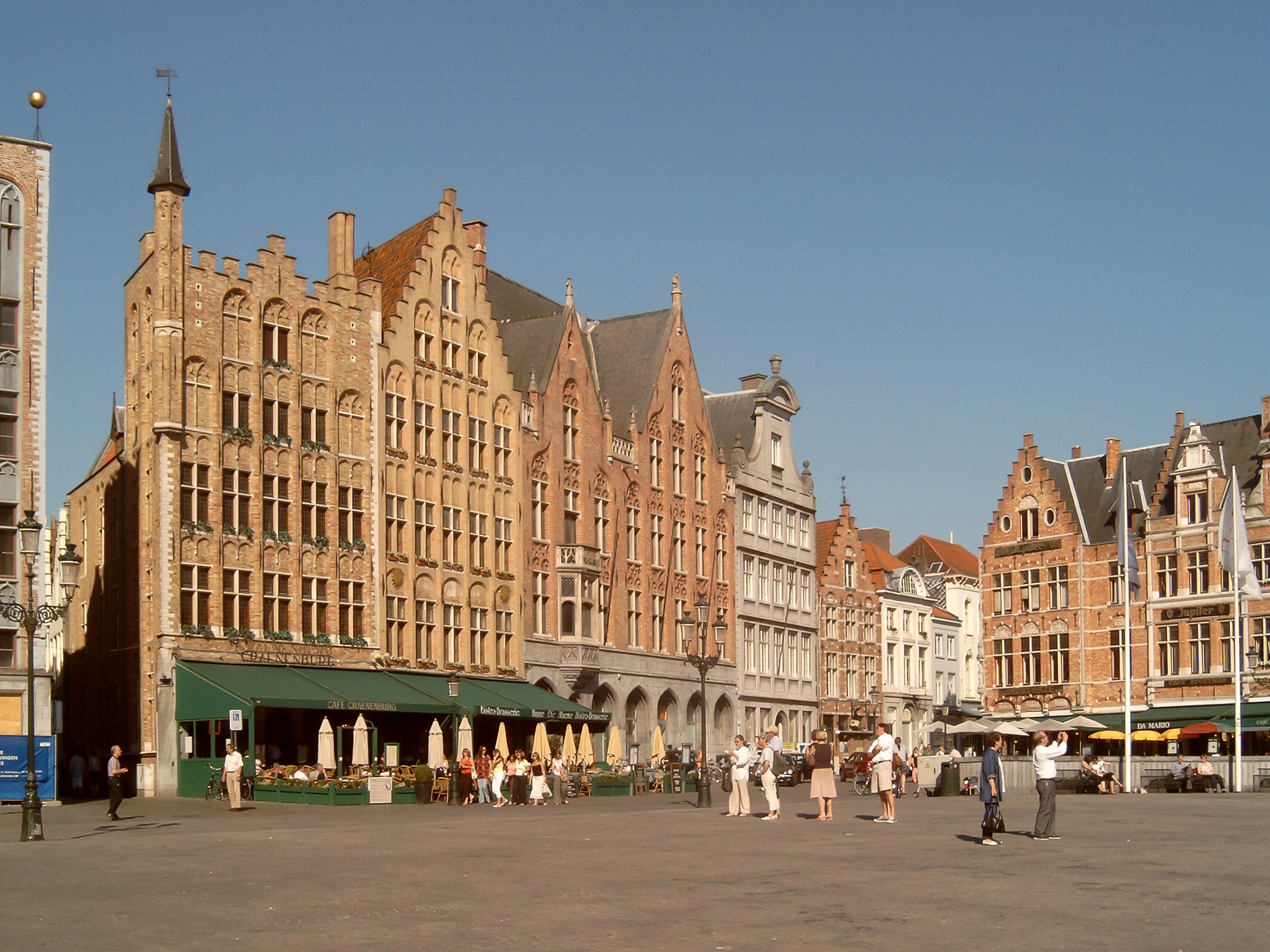
Part of the Markt (market square)

=== Religion and religious landmarks ===
The patron saint of both the city of Bruges and the Roman Catholic Diocese of Bruges is Donatian of Reims. St. Salvator's Cathedral is therefore also known as the Cathedral of the Saviour and St. Donat.

The Basilica of the Holy Blood (Dutch: Heilig-Bloedbasiliek) houses the relic of the Holy Blood, which was brought to the city after the Second Crusade by Thierry of Alsace, and is paraded every year through the streets of the city. More than 1,600 inhabitants take part in this mile-long religious procession, many dressed as medieval knights or crusaders.

Since 1305, on the Assumption of Mary. the Brugse Belofte procession is organized in order to honour a vow made by the wives of the militia men from Bruges: if their husbands were to return safely from the war with France; every year a thirty-six pound candle would be offered to Saint Mary.

Other religious landmarks and museums include the Church of Our Lady, English Convent, Jerusalem Church, St. Trudo's Abbey, Ten Wijngaerde Beguinage (Dutch: Begijnhof), and Ter Doest Abbey (Dutch: Abdij Ter Doest) in Lissewege.

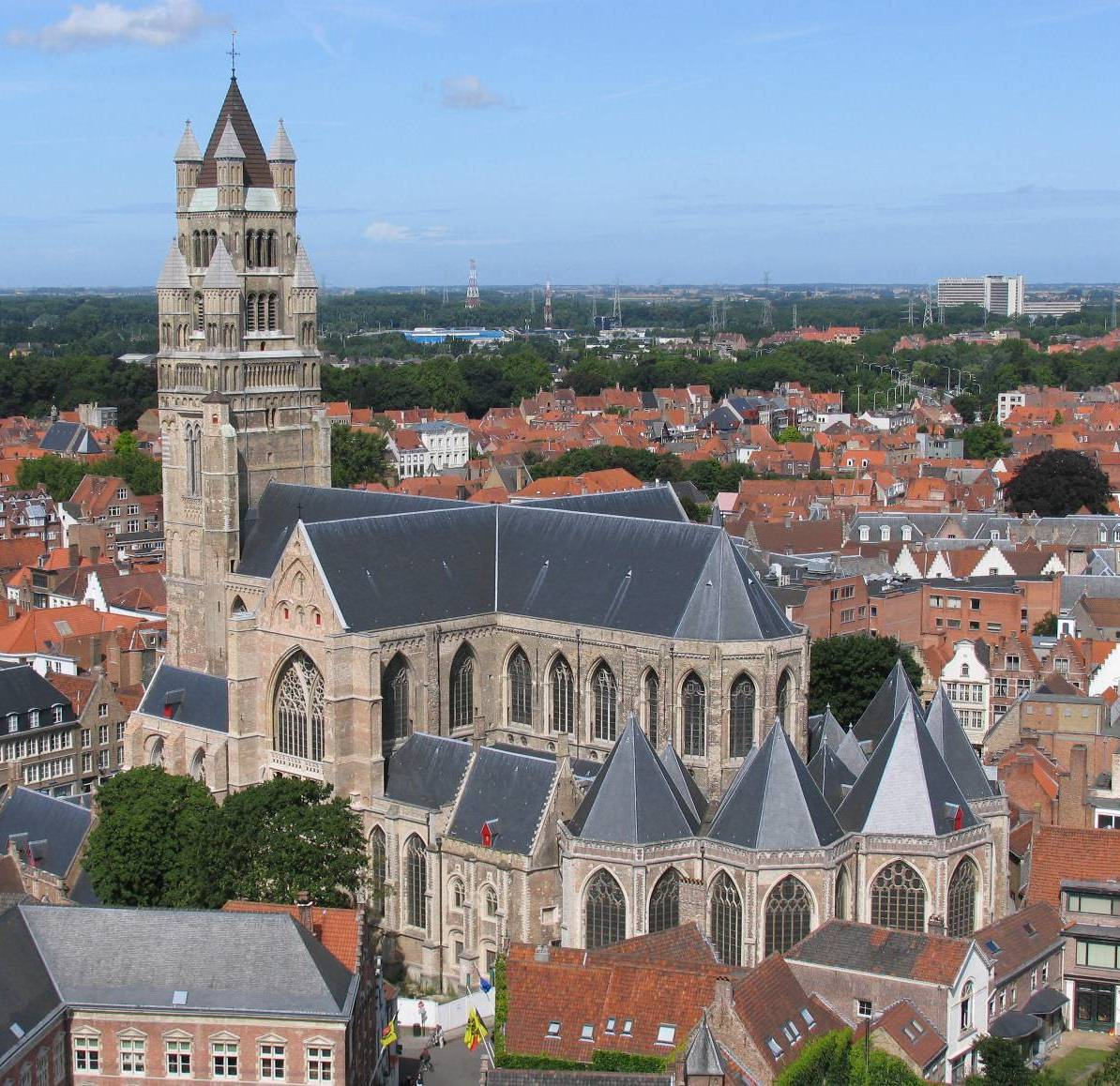
St. Salvator's Cathedral

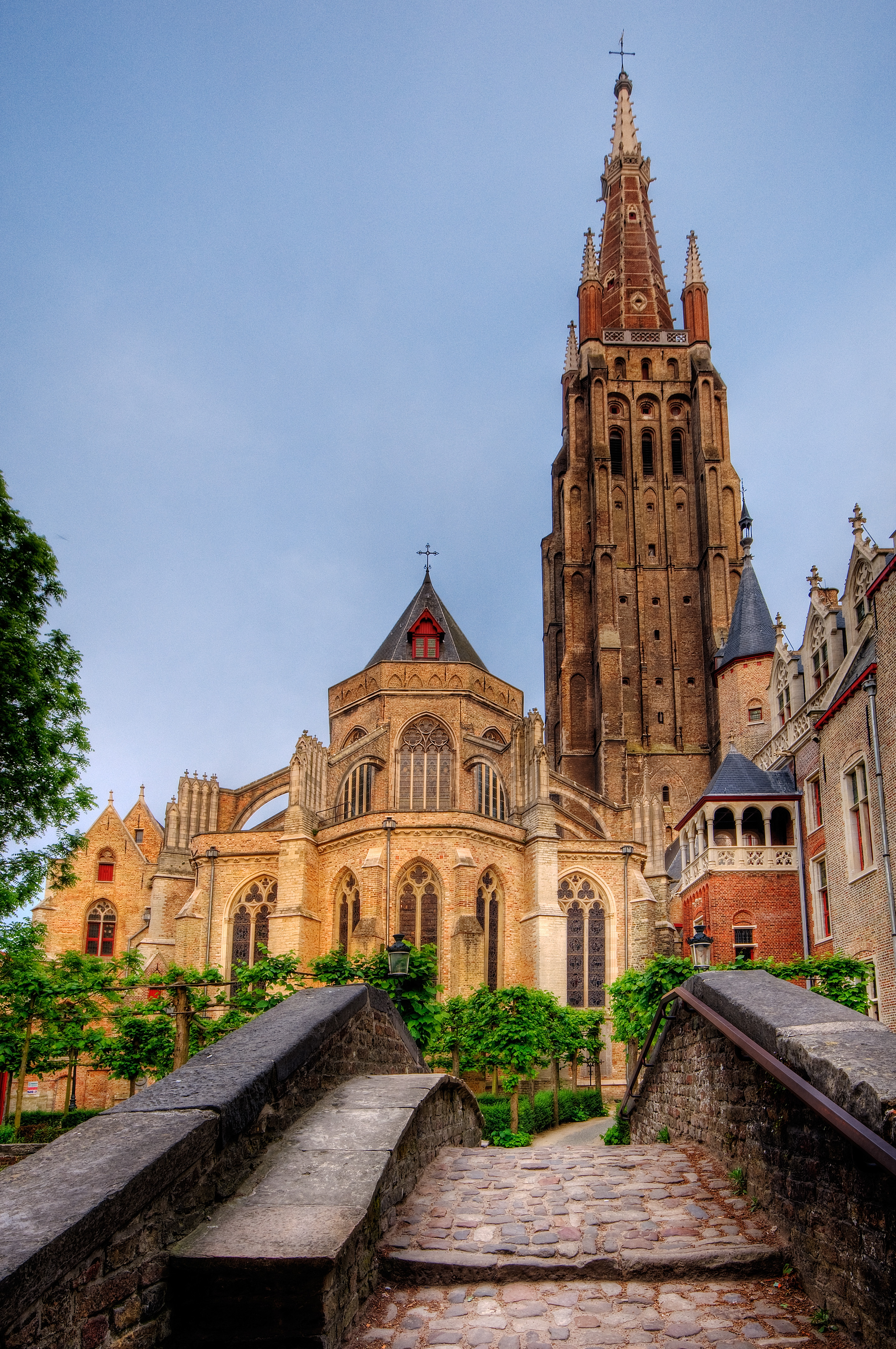
Church of Our Lady

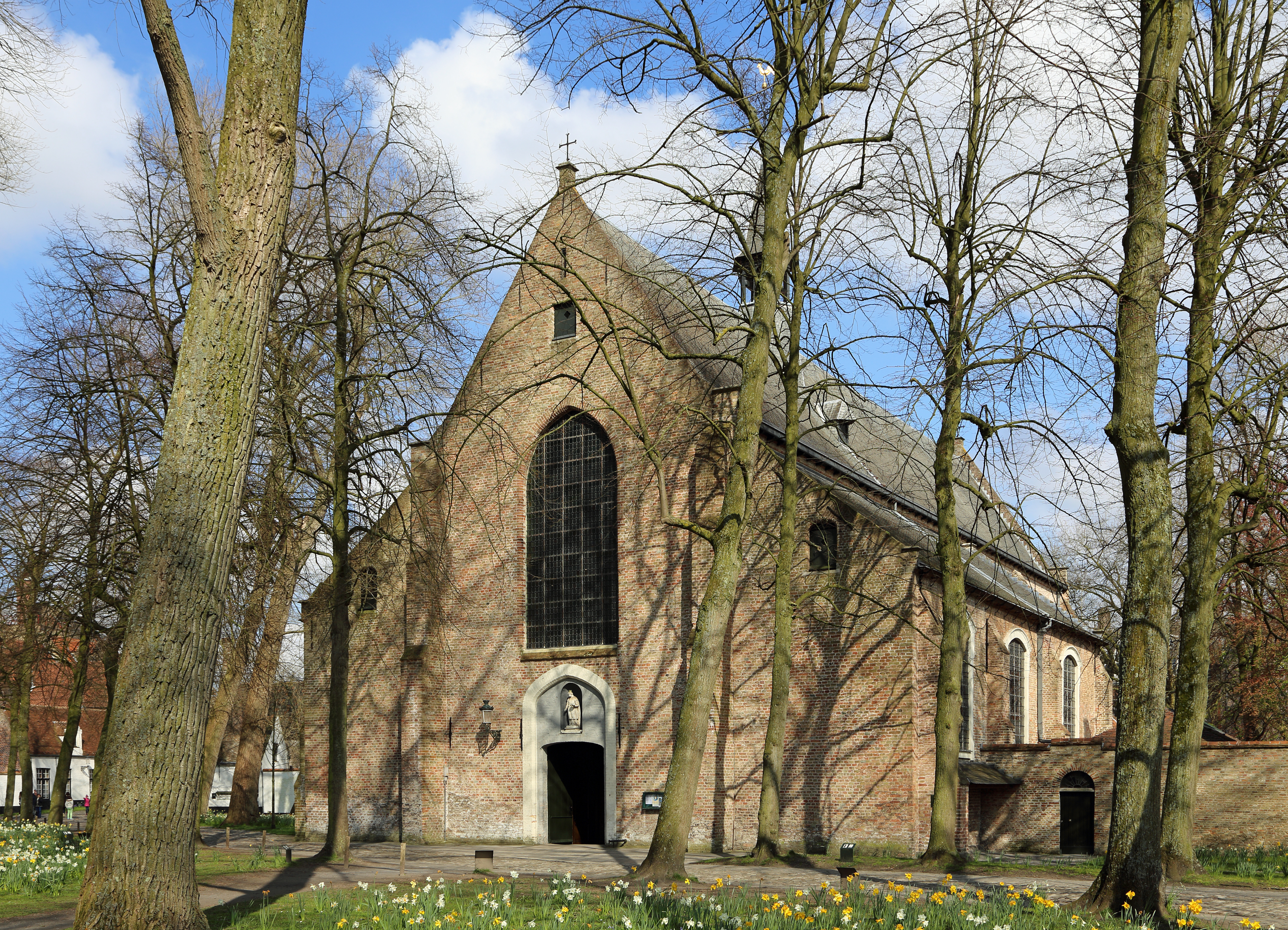
The Beguinage

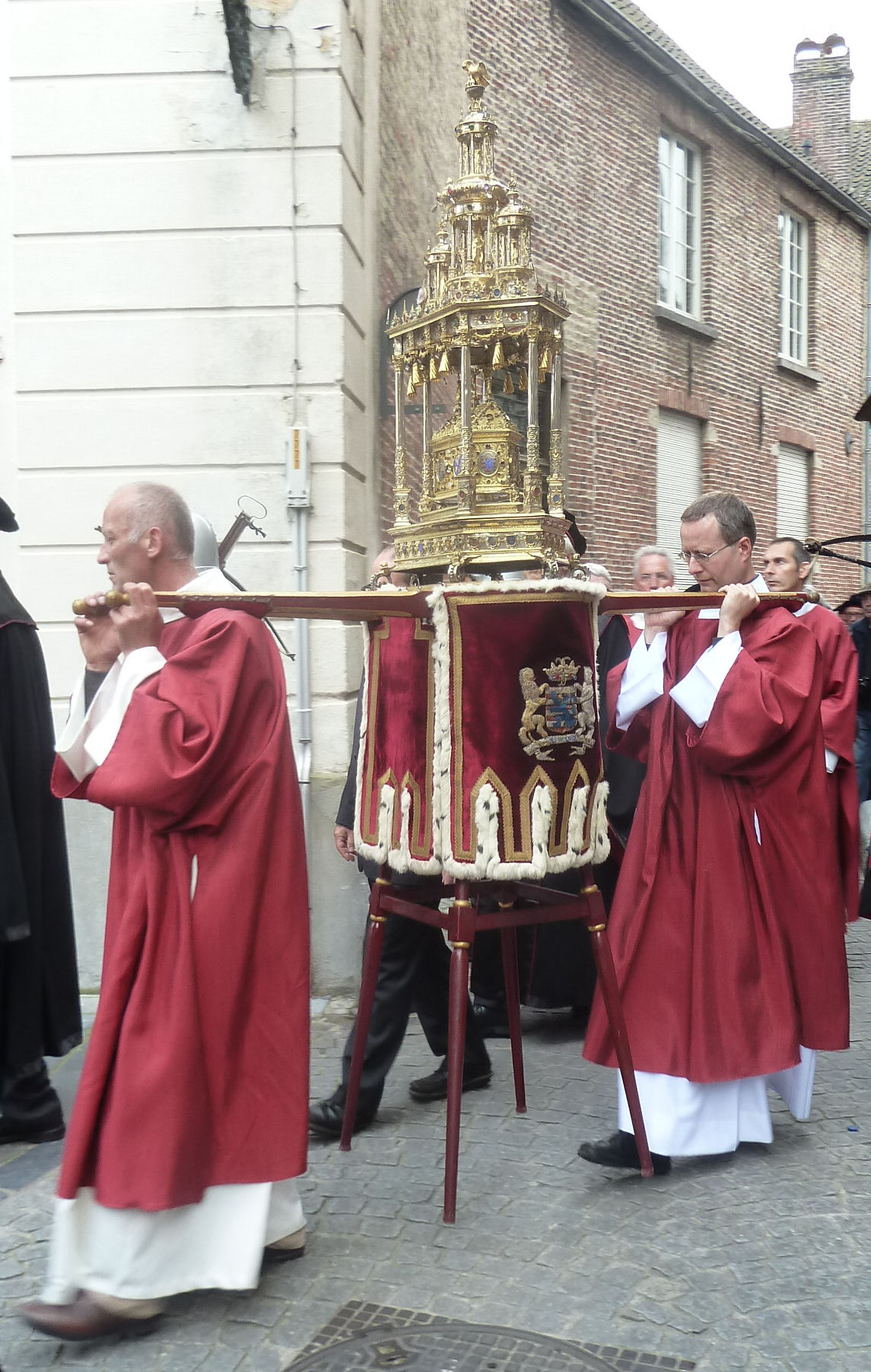
Procession of the Holy Blood

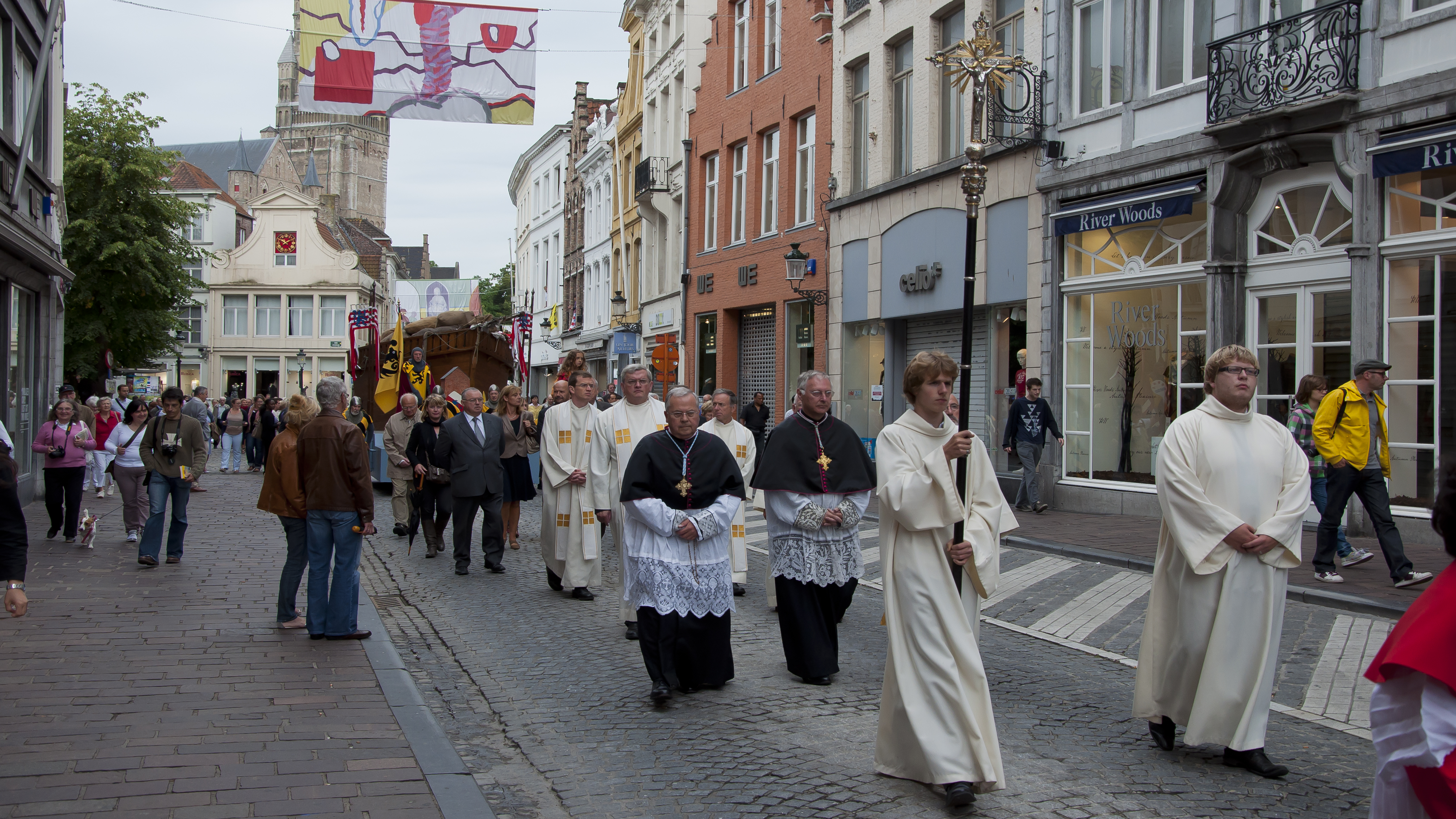
Brugse Belofte procession in 2010

== Transport ==
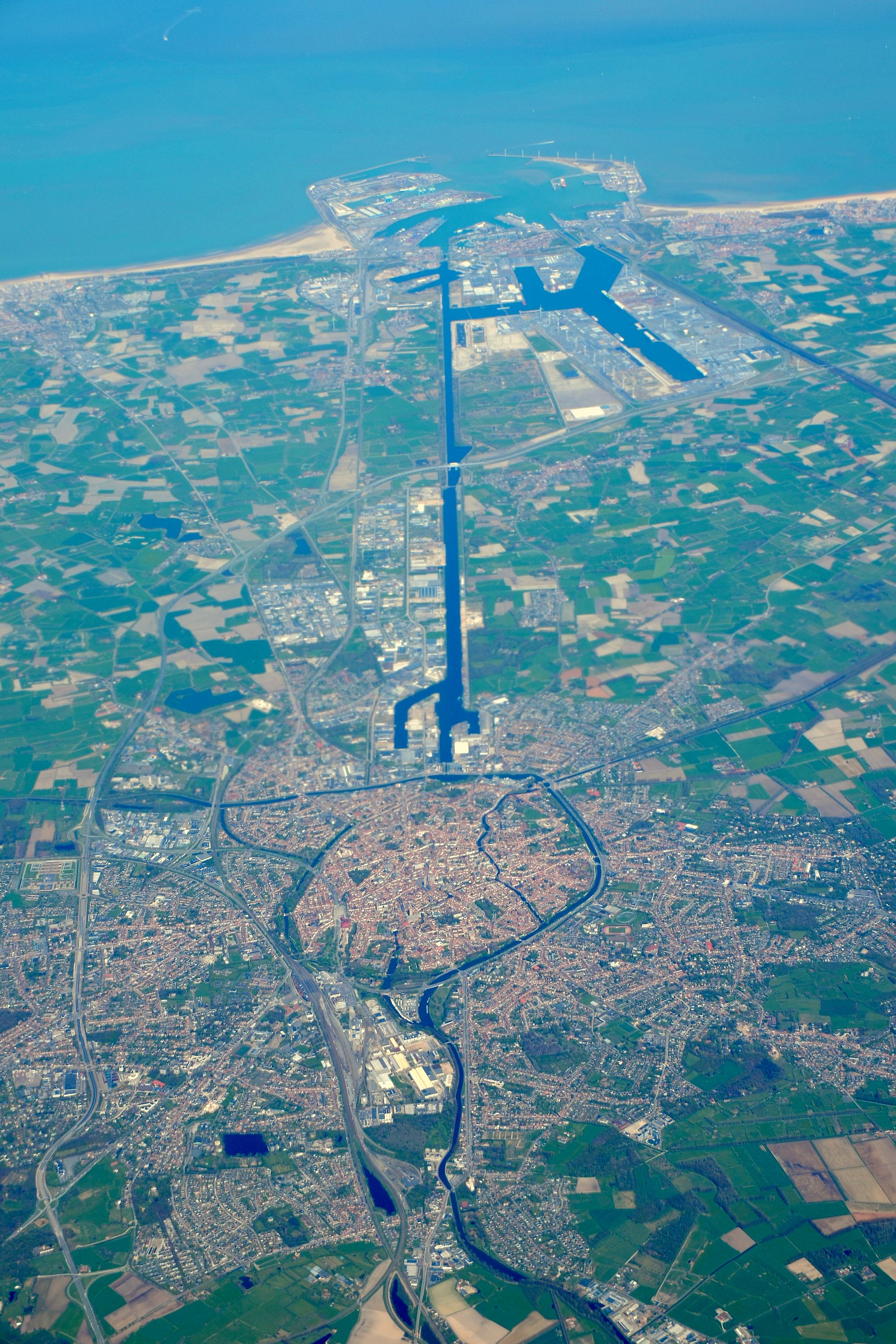
Aerial view of the Boudewijnkanaal canal linking Zeebrugge (top) with Bruges (middle)

=== Road ===
Bruges has motorway connections in all directions:

- to Ostend
- to Ghent and Brussels
- to Veurne and France
- to Kortrijk and Tournai
- to Zeebrugge
- to Antwerp

Driving within the 'egg', the historical centre enclosed by the main circle of canals in Bruges is discouraged by traffic management schemes, including a network of one-way streets. The system encourages the use of set routes leading to central car parks and direct exit routes. The car parks are convenient for the central commercial and tourist areas; they are not expensive.

=== Railway ===
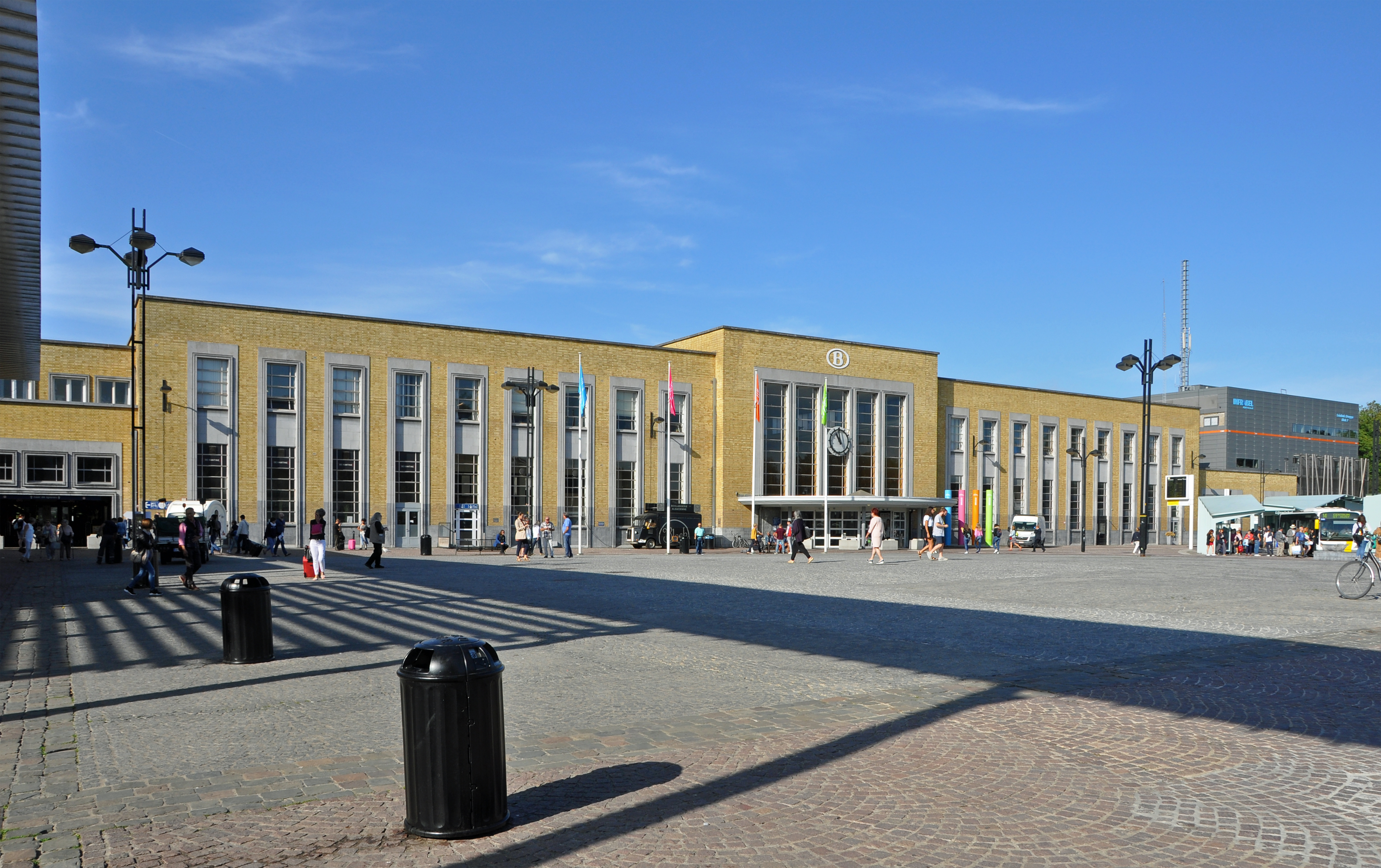
Brugge railway station

Bruges' main railway station is the focus of lines to the Belgian coast. It also provides at least hourly trains to all other major cities in Belgium, as well as to Lille in France. Further there are several regional and local trains.

A third track is being constructed between Bruges and Dudzele, the junction for Zeebrugge to alleviate congestion. Similarly, two extra tracks are being built between Bruges and Ghent.

Bus links to the centre are frequent, though the railway station is just a 10-minute walk from the main shopping streets and a 20-minute walk from Market Square.

=== Air ===
The national Brussels Airport, one hour away by train or car, offers the best connections. The nearest airport is the Ostend-Bruges International Airport in Ostend (around 25 kilometres (16 miles) from the city centre of Bruges), but it offers limited passenger transport and connections. Recently there also started a direct bus line from Brussels South Charleroi Airport to Bruges.

=== Public city transport ===
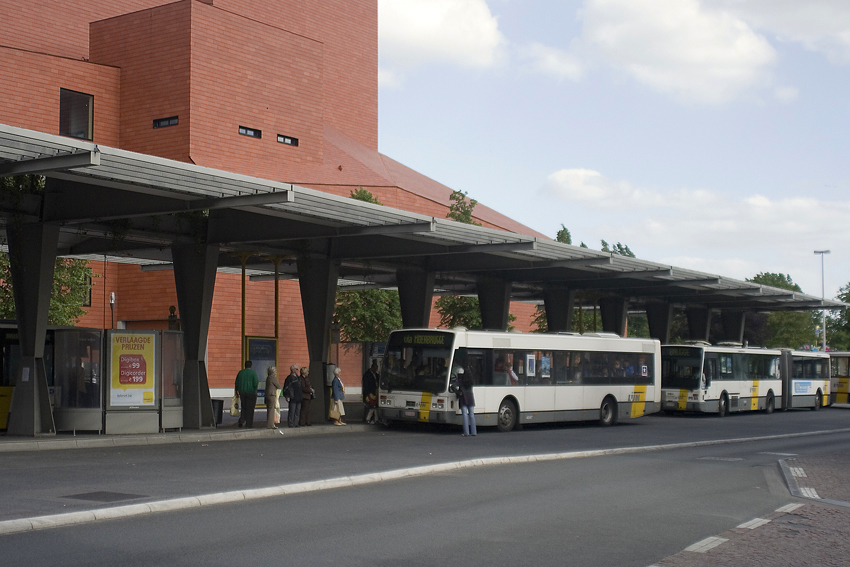
't Zand bus station

Bruges has an extensive web of bus lines, operated by De Lijn, providing access to the city centre and the suburbs (city lines, Dutch: stadslijnen) and to many towns and villages in the region around the city (regional lines, Dutch: streeklijnen). In support of the municipal traffic management (see "Road" above), free public transport is available for those who park their cars in the main railway station car park.

=== Cycling ===
Although a few streets are restricted, no part of Bruges is car-free. Cars are required to yield to pedestrians and cyclists. Plans have long been underway to ban cars altogether from the historic center of Bruges or to restrict traffic much more than it currently is, but these plans have yet to come to fruition. In 2005, signs were changed for the convenience of cyclists, allowing two-way cycle traffic on more streets; however, car traffic has not decreased.

=== Port ===
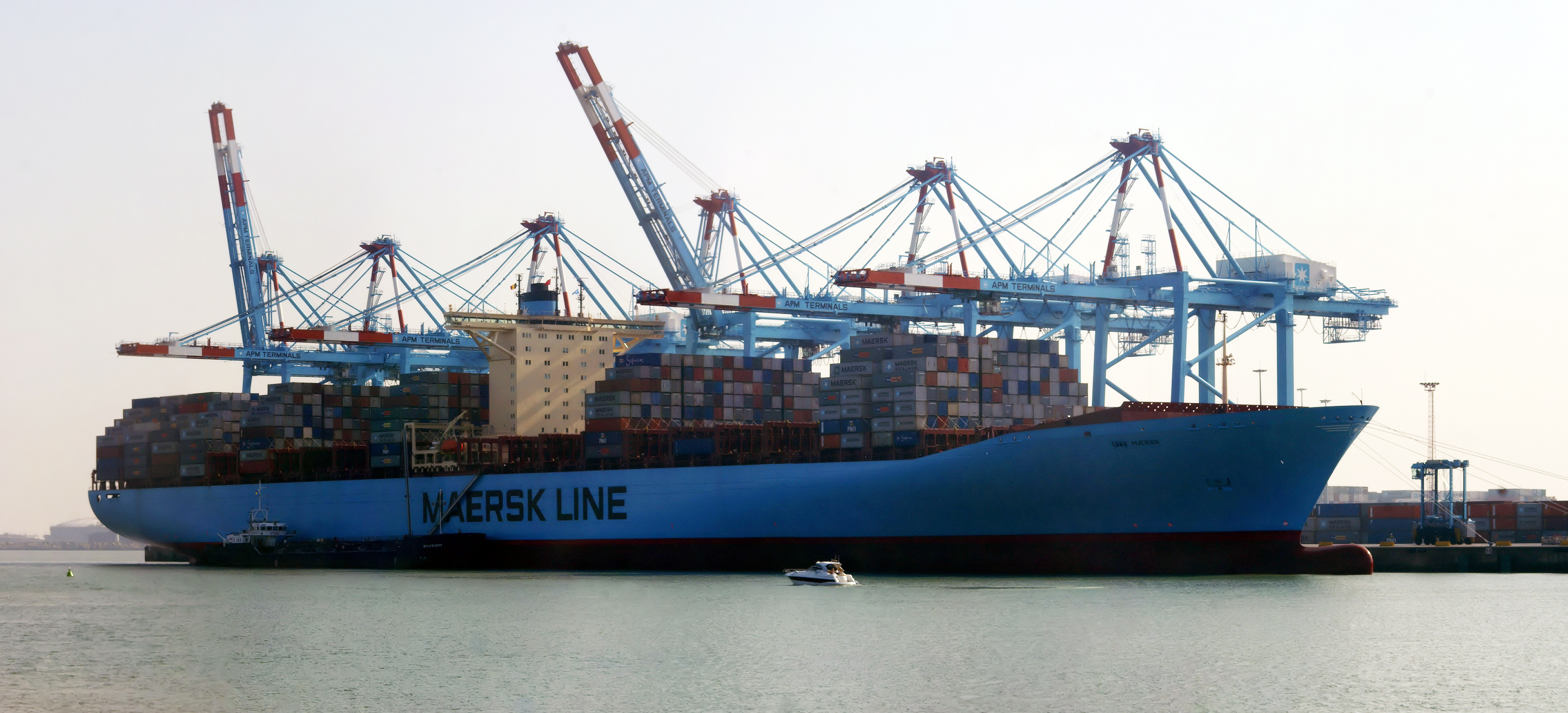
The Elly Mærsk, one of the world's largest container ships, at Zeebrugge

The port of Bruges is Zeebrugge (Flemish for Bruges-on-Sea).

On 6 March 1987, the British ferry Herald of Free Enterprise capsized after leaving the port, killing 187 people, in the worst disaster involving a British civilian vessel since 1919; it had set sail with its bow door open. The Herald of Free Enterprise was a passenger ship bound for the Port of Dover in England. Most of the occupants had taken advantage of a newspaper promotion offering a £1 return trip from Dover to Zeebrugge.

== Demographics ==
Bruges is the sixth most populous city in the country after Brussels, Antwerp, Charleroi, Liège, and Ghent.

Group of origin	Year	
Group of origin	2023	
Group of origin	Number	%
Belgians with Belgian background	97,936	81.93%
Belgians with foreign background	12,006	10.04%
Neighbouring country	2,433	2.04%
EU27 (excluding neighbouring country)	1,350	1.13%
Outside EU 27	8,223	6.88%
Non-Belgians	9,599	8.03%
Neighbouring country	1,541	1.29%
EU27 (excluding neighbouring country)	3,266	2.73%
Outside EU 27	4,792	4.01%
Total	119,541	100%

== Sport ==
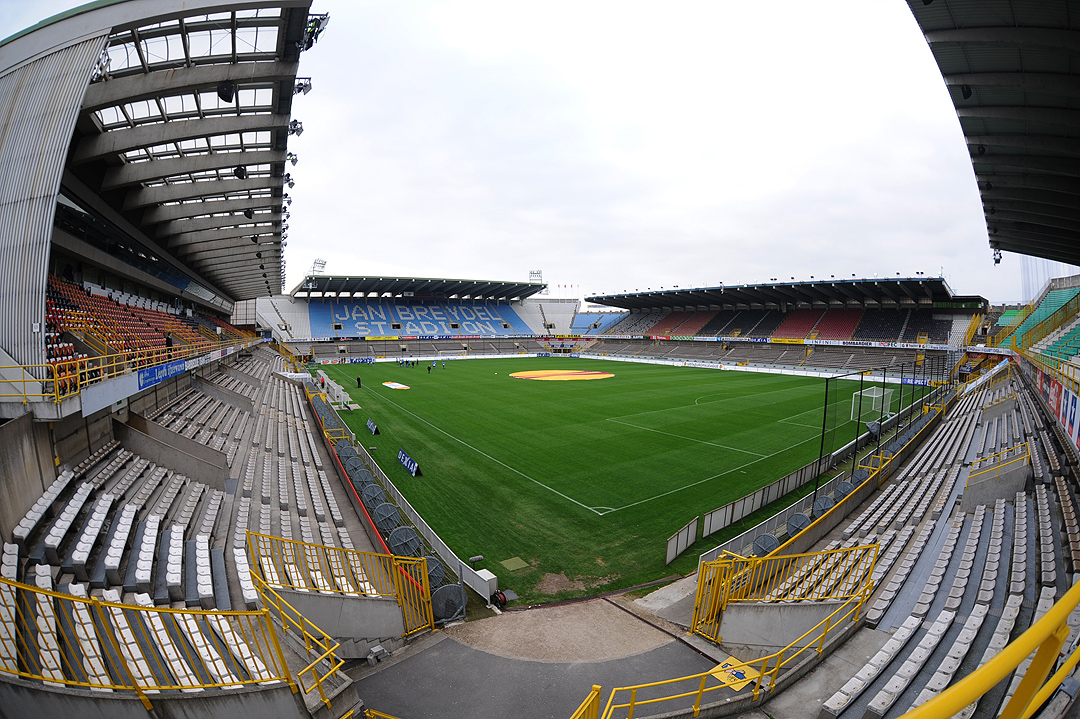
Jan Breydel Stadium

Between 1998 and 2016, Bruges hosted the start of the annual Tour of Flanders cycle race, held in April and one of the biggest sporting events in Belgium.

Football is also popular in Bruges; the city hosts two professional football teams, both of which play at the top level (Belgian First Division) Club Brugge K.V. and Cercle Brugge K.S.V.. Both teams play their home games at the Jan Breydel Stadium (30,000 seats) in Sint-Andries. There are plans for a new stadium for Club Brugge with about 45,000 seats in the north of the city, while the city council would renovate and reduce the capacity of the Jan Breydel Stadium for Cercle Brugge.

In 2000, Bruges was one of the eight host cities for the UEFA European Football Championship, co-hosted by Belgium and its neighbour the Netherlands.

In 2021, Bruges, along with Leuven, hosted the UCI Road World Championships.

== Education ==
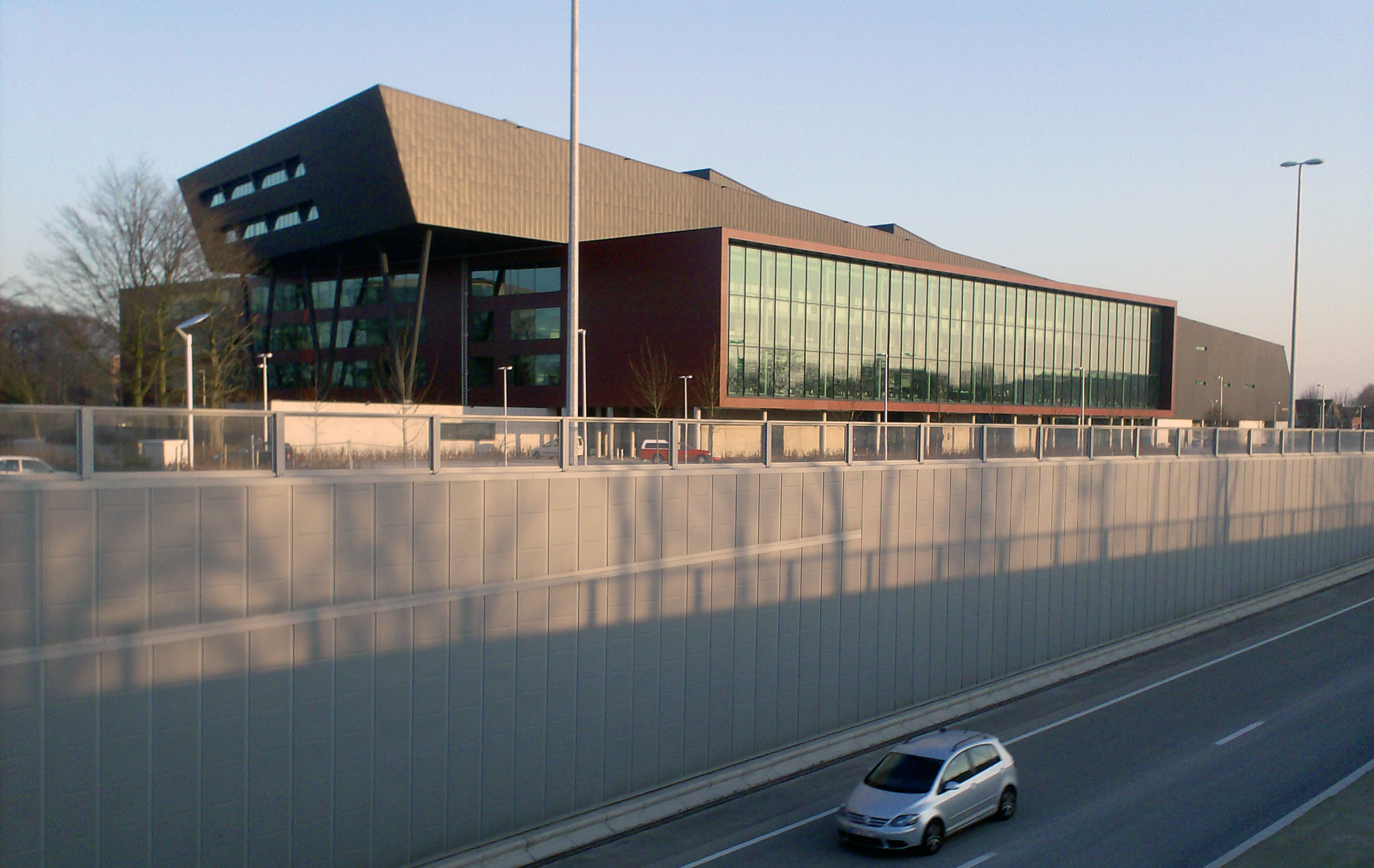
The KHBO campus in Sint-Michiels

Bruges is a centre for education in West Flanders. Next to the several common primary and secondary schools, there are a few colleges, like the VIVES (a fusion of the former KHBO (Katholieke Hogeschool Brugge Oostende) and the KATHO (katholieke hogeschool) or the HOWEST (Hogeschool West-Vlaanderen). Furthermore, the city is home to the College of Europe, a prestigious institution of postgraduate studies in European Economics, Law, and Politics, and of the United Nations University Institute on Comparative Regional Integration Studies (UNU-CRIS), a Research and Training Institute of the United Nations University specialising in the comparative study of regional integration.

== In popular culture ==
=== Notable people ===
The following people were born in Bruges:
- Jan Breydel and Pieter de Coninck, freedom fighters
- Hugo Claus, Belgian author (1929–2008)
- Guido Gezelle, poet and priest (1830–1899)
- Franciscus Gomarus, Calvinist theologian (1563–1641)
- Gotye, Australian-Belgian singer-songwriter (1980)
- Isidore van Kinsbergen, Dutch-Flemish engraver, (1821–1905)
- Tony Parker, NBA Basketball Player (1982)
- Philip I of Castile, first Habsburg ruler in Spain (1478–1506)
- Simon Stevin, mathematician and engineer (1548–1620)
In the 15th century, the city became the magnet for several prominent personalities:
- Philip the Good, Duke of Burgundy set up court in Bruges, Brussels, and Lille
- William Caxton, English merchant, diplomat, writer, and printer
- Petrus Christus, Flemish painter
- Gerard David, Flemish painter
- Hans Memling, Flemish painter
- Jan van Eyck, Flemish painter
- Juan Luís Vives, Spanish scholar and humanist
- Simon Bening, Flemish illuminator
- Levina Teerlinc, Flemish illuminator

=== Literature ===
- Hendrik Conscience's The Lion of Flanders, or the Battle of the Golden Spurs (1836, Dutch: De Leeuw van Vlaenderen, of de Slag der Gulden Sporen), is a historical-fiction novel based on the medieval Franco-Flemish War and the Battle of the Golden Spurs, both of which historically include Bruges.
- Ludwig Bemelmans' children's novel The Golden Basket (1936) tells the story of a family's visit to Bruges. In the novel, the two sisters stay at the Golden Basket hotel in Bruges with their father. On a visit to Bruges cathedral with the innkeeper's son, the sisters meet a dozen little schoolgirls, the first appearance of Bemelmans' best-known character, Madeline.
- Bruges-la-Morte (1892), a short novel by the Belgian author Georges Rodenbach. The libretto of Erich Wolfgang Korngold's opera Die tote Stadt (1920) is based on this book.
- The detective stories of Belgian writer Pieter Aspe are situated in Bruges.
- Niccolò Rising (1986), the first volume of Dorothy Dunnett's eight-book series House of Niccolò, is largely set in Bruges. Other books in the series also have sections set in the Belgian city.
- L'Astrologue de Bruges ("The Astrologer of Bruges", 1994), a Belgian bande dessinée in the Yoko Tsuno comic series, is entirely set in both contemporary and 1545's Bruges.

=== Film ===
- Fred Zinneman's The Nun's Story is a 1959 dramatic film starring Audrey Hepburn that is primarily set in Bruges.
- The Killer Is on the Phone (Italian: L'assassino... è al telefono) is a 1972 giallo film set in Bruges.
- The main antagonist of the Austin Powers film series, Dr. Evil, was raised in Bruges.
- The 2008 film In Bruges, starring Colin Farrell and Brendan Gleeson, is set almost entirely in Bruges. Throughout the film, which was directed by British-Irish director Martin McDonagh, the city's major landmarks and history are mentioned repeatedly, as are the contrasted viewpoints of the two lead characters of the story.
- In 2014 Bollywood film PK, opening scenes involving Anushka Sharma and Sushant Singh Rajput (including song Chaar Kadam) are set in Bruges.
- The story of the Madonna of Bruges being removed by the Nazis and then returned is told in the fact-based 2014 movie The Monuments Men.
- The 2019 Hallmark movie Love, Romance & Chocolate, starring Lacey Chabert, takes place in Bruges.

== Town twinning policy ==
Bruges has never formally ratified any twin towns and sister cities collaboration. In the 1950s, Bruges refused a jumelage with Nice, Nuremberg, Locarno and Venice that had been signed by a Belgian ambassador without consultation. The twinning between some of the former municipalities, merged with Bruges in 1971, was discontinued.

Bruges has had the following international contacts:

- Bastogne, Belgium: After World War II and into the 1970s, Bruges, more specifically the Fire Brigade of Bruges, entertained friendly relations with Bastogne. Each year a free holiday was offered at the seaside in Zeebrugge, to children from the Nuts city.
- Arolsen, Germany: From the 1950s until the 1980s, Bruges was the patron of the Belgian First Regiment of Horse Guards, quartered in Arolsen.
- Salamanca, Spain: Both towns having been made European Capital of Culture in 2002, Bruges had some exchanges organized with Salamanca.
- Mons, Belgium: In 2007, cultural and artistic cooperation between Mons and Bruges was inaugurated.
- Burgos, Spain: On 29 January 2007, the mayors of Burgos and Bruges signed a declaration of intent about future cooperation on cultural, touristic and economic matters.

== Sources ==
- De Maesschalck, Edward (2019). De Graven van Vlaanderen (861-1384) [The Counts of Flanders (861-1384)] (in Dutch) (2nd ed.). DavidsFonds / Standaard uitgeverij. ISBN 9789002268458.
- Hellinga, Gerben Graddesz (2013). Graven Van Vlaanderen [Counts Of Flanders] (in Dutch). Zutphen: Walburg pers. ISBN 9789057309250.
- Oksanen, Eljas (2012). Flanders and the Anglo-Norman World, 1066-1216. Cambridge University Press.
- Trio, Paul; Heirbaut, Dirk; van den Auweele, Dirk (2002). Omtrent 1302 [About 1302] (in Dutch). Leuven: Universitaire Pers Leuven. ISBN 9058672085.
