= Brazilian Portuguese =

Variety of Portuguese language

- português brasileiro
- Native to: Brazil
- Ethnicity: Brazilians
- Native speakers: ~203 million (2022)
- Language family: Indo-European: Italic; Latino-Faliscan; Latin; Romance; Italo-Western; Western Romance; Gallo-Iberian; Iberian Romance; West Iberian; Galician–Portuguese; Portuguese; Brazilian Portuguese
- Early forms: Old Latin: Vulgar Latin; Proto-Romance; Galician–Portuguese

Language codes
- ISO 639-1: pt-BR
- ISO 639-3: -
- Glottolog: braz1246

Brazilian Portuguese (português brasileiro; [poʁtuˈɡe(j)z bɾaziˈle(j)ɾu]) is the set of varieties of the Portuguese language native to Brazil. It is spoken by nearly all of the 203 million inhabitants of Brazil, and widely across the Brazilian diaspora, consisting of approximately two million Brazilians who have emigrated to other countries.

Freddie speaking a regional accent of Brazilian Portuguese

Brazilian Portuguese differs from varieties spoken in Portugal and Portuguese-speaking African countries, particularly in phonology and prosody. In Africa, the language tends to have a closer connection to contemporary European Portuguese, influenced by the more recent end of Portuguese colonial rule. This has contributed to a notable difference in the relationship between written, formal language and spoken forms in Brazilian Portuguese. The differences between formal written Portuguese and informal spoken varieties in Brazilian Portuguese have been documented in sociolinguistic studies. Some scholars, including Mario A. Perini, have suggested that these differences might exhibit characteristics of diglossia, though this interpretation remains a subject of debate among linguists. Other researchers argue that such variation aligns with patterns observed in other pluricentric languages and is best understood in the context of Brazil's educational, political, and linguistic history, including post-independence standardization efforts. Despite this pronounced difference between the spoken varieties, Brazilian and European Portuguese barely differ in formal writing and remain mutually intelligible. (Note: Though there are other notable Portuguese varieties in the Americas, either long native but non-official in their countries, such as Uruguayan Portuguese, in border regions of Uruguay, which is non-official, and among migrant Portuguese-speaking communities in countries like Venezuela and the United States, often speaking regional varieties of either Brazilian or European Portuguese.)

In 1990, the Community of Portuguese Language Countries (CPLP), which included representatives from all countries with Portuguese as the official language, reached an agreement on the reform of the Portuguese orthography to unify the two standards then in use by Brazil on one side and the remaining Portuguese-speaking countries on the other. This spelling reform went into effect in Brazil on 1 January 2009. In Portugal, the reform was signed into law by the President on 21 July 2008 allowing for a six-year adaptation period, during which both orthographies co-existed. All of the CPLP countries have signed the reform. In Brazil, this reform has been in force since January 2016. Portugal and other Portuguese-speaking countries have since begun using the new orthography.

Regional varieties of Brazilian Portuguese, while remaining mutually intelligible, may diverge from each other in matters such as vowel pronunciation and intonation.

== History ==
Portuguese-speaking world including Brazil, Portugal, Angola, etc.

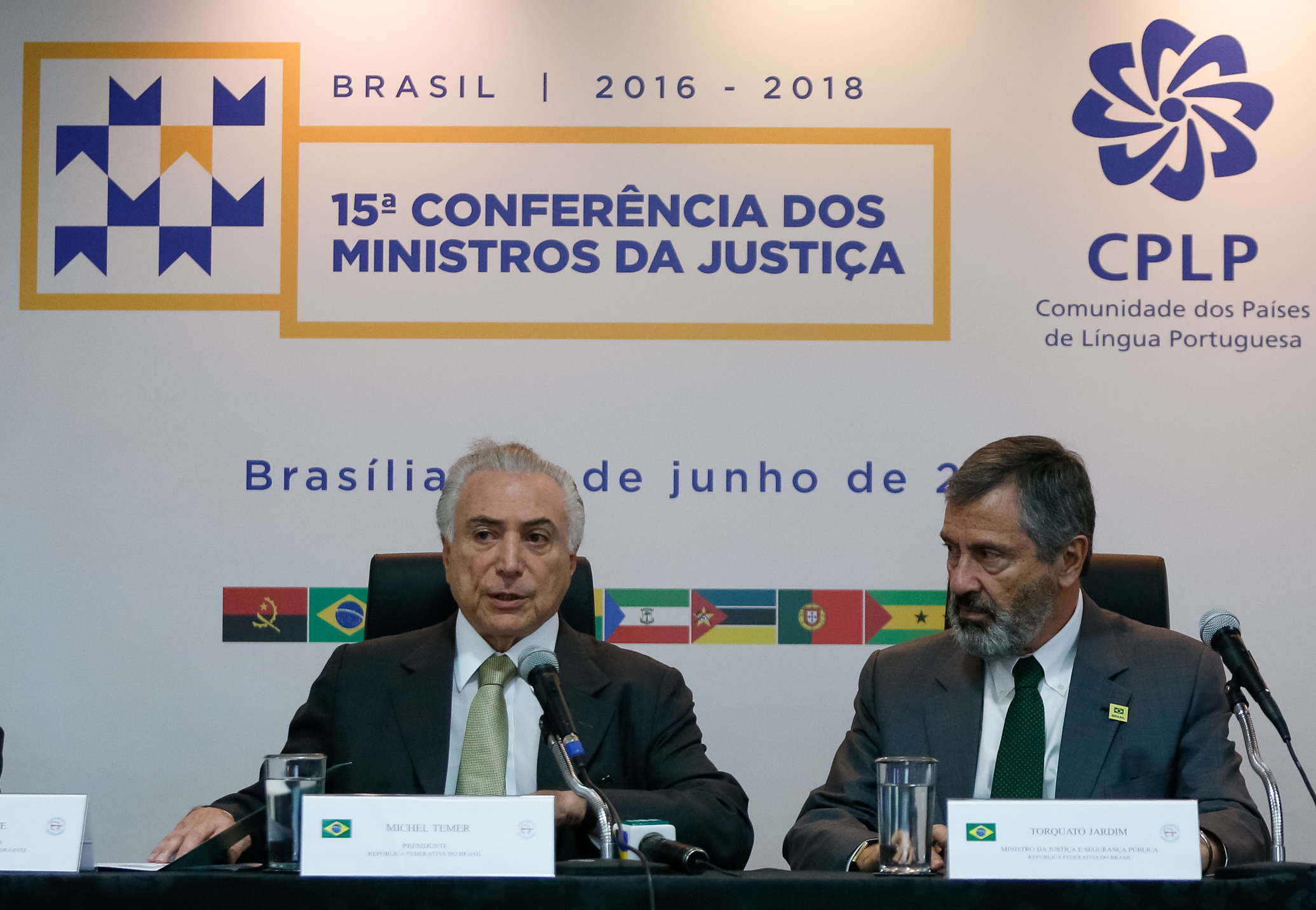
Opening of the 15th Conference of Ministers of Justice of the Community of Portuguese Language Countries in 2017. Then-Brazilian president Michel Temer with then-Brazilian justice minister Torquato Jardim.

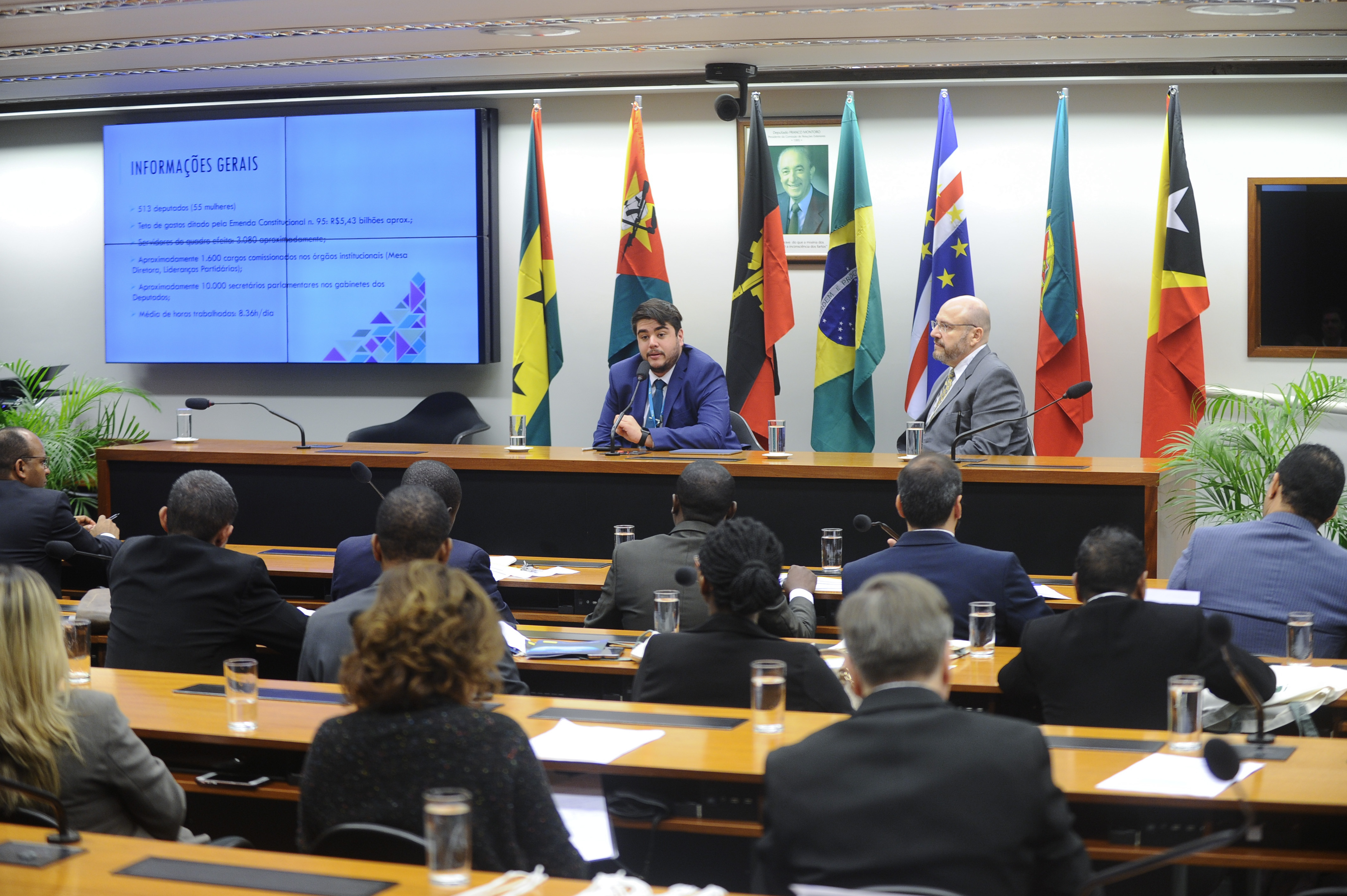
2017 Debate on the Portuguese language in the Senate of Brazil.

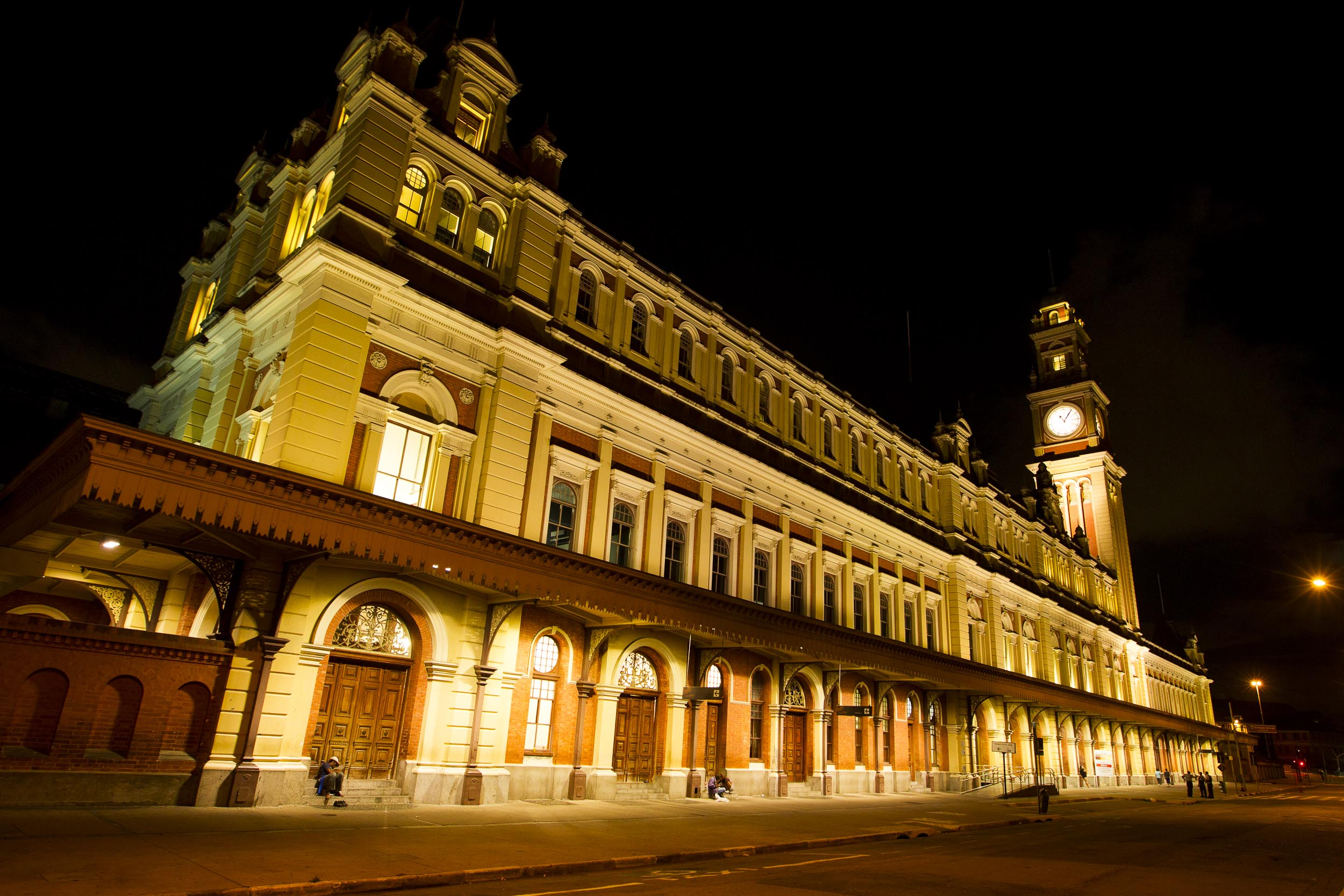
Museum of the Portuguese Language in São Paulo.

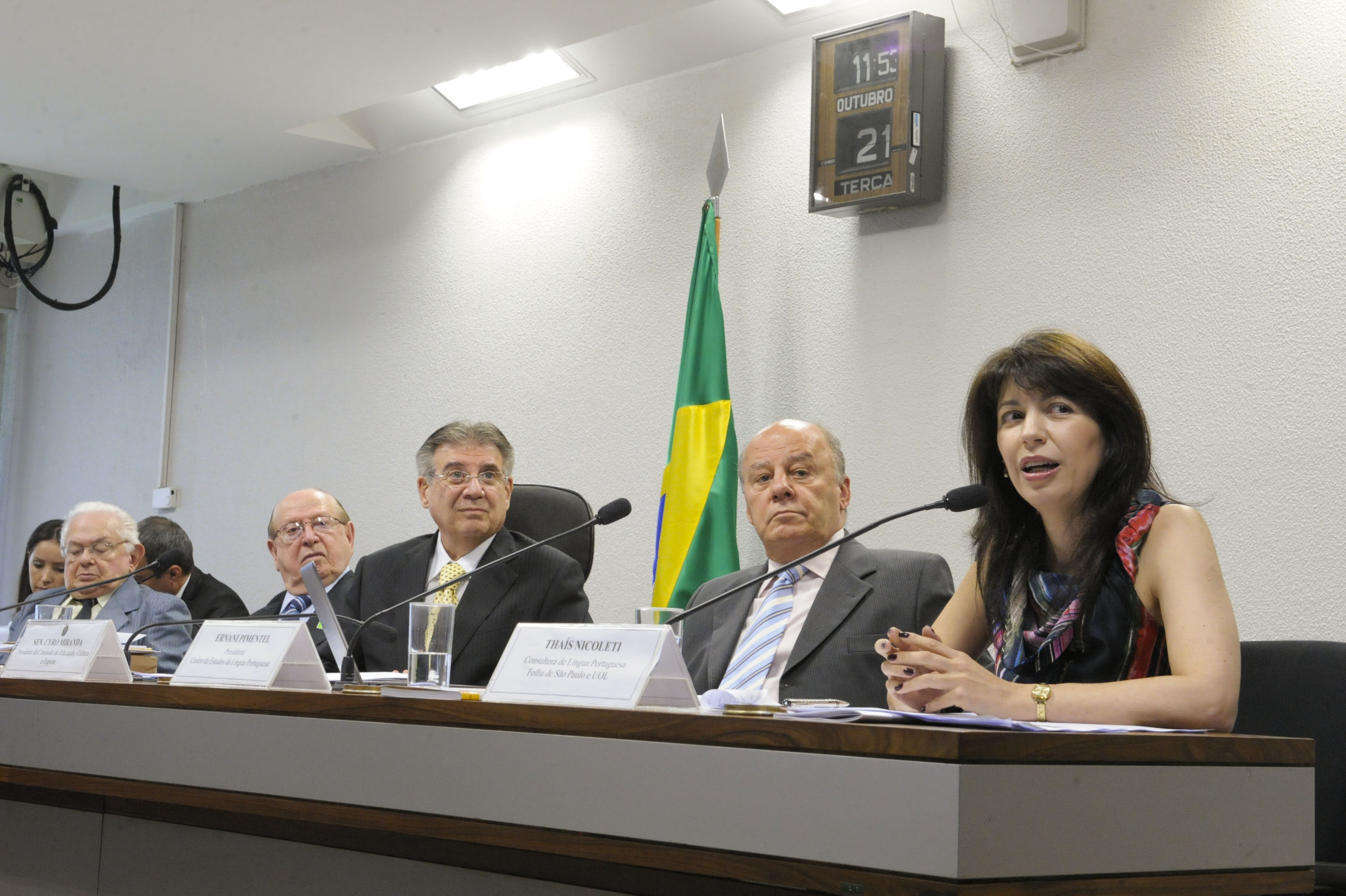
2014 Interactive public hearing to debate the Portuguese Language Orthographic Agreement in Brasília.

=== Portuguese language in Brazil ===
The existence of Portuguese in Brazil is a legacy of the Portuguese colonization of the Americas. The first wave of Portuguese-speaking immigrants settled in Brazil in the 16th century, but the language was not widely used then. For a time Portuguese coexisted with Língua Geral, a lingua franca based on Amerindian languages that was used by the Jesuit missionaries, as well as with various African languages spoken by the millions of slaves brought into the country between the 16th and 19th centuries. By the end of the 18th century, Portuguese had affirmed itself as the national language. Some of the main contributions to that swift change were the expansion of colonization to the Brazilian interior, and the growing numbers of Portuguese settlers, who brought their language and became the most important ethnic group in Brazil.

Beginning in the early 18th century, Portugal's government made efforts to expand the use of Portuguese throughout the colony, particularly because its consolidation in Brazil would help guarantee to Portugal the lands in dispute with Spain (according to various treaties signed in the 18th century, those lands would be ceded to the people who effectively occupied them). Under the administration of the Marquis of Pombal (1750–1777), Brazilians started to favour the use of Portuguese, as the Marquis expelled the Jesuit missionaries (who had taught Língua Geral) and prohibited the use of Nhengatu, or Lingua Franca.

The failed colonization attempts, by the French in Rio de Janeiro during the 16th century and the Dutch in Recife during the 17th century, had negligible effects on Portuguese. The substantial waves of non-Portuguese-speaking immigrants in the late 19th and early 20th centuries (mostly from Italy, Spain, Germany, Poland, Japan and Lebanon) were linguistically integrated into the Portuguese-speaking majority within a few generations, except for some areas of the three southernmost states (Paraná, Santa Catarina, and Rio Grande do Sul), in the case of Germans, Italians and Slavics, and in rural areas of the state of São Paulo (Italians and Japanese).

Nowadays the overwhelming majority of Brazilians speak Portuguese as their mother tongue, with the exception of small, insular communities of descendants of European (German, Polish, Ukrainian, and Italian) and Japanese immigrants, mostly in the South and Southeast as well as villages and reservations inhabited by Amerindians. And even these populations make use of Portuguese to communicate with outsiders and to understand television and radio broadcasts, for example. Moreover, there is a community of Brazilian Sign Language users whose number is estimated by Ethnologue to be as high as 3 million.

=== Loanwords ===
The development of Portuguese in Brazil (and consequently in the rest of the areas where Portuguese is spoken) has been influenced by other languages with which it has come into contact, mainly in the lexicon: first the Amerindian languages of the original inhabitants, then the various African languages spoken by the slaves, and finally those of later European and Asian immigrants. Although the vocabulary is still predominantly Portuguese, the influence of other languages is evident in the Brazilian lexicon, which today includes, for example, hundreds of words of Tupi–Guarani origin referring to local flora and fauna; numerous West African Yoruba words related to foods, religious concepts, and musical expressions; and English terms from the fields of modern technology and commerce. Although some of these words are more predominant in Brazil, they are also used in Portugal and other countries where Portuguese is spoken.

Words derived from the Tupi language are particularly prevalent in place names (Caruaru, Guanabara, Ipanema, Itaquaquecetuba, Paraíba, Pindamonhangaba). The native languages also contributed the names of most of the plants and animals found in Brazil (and most of these are the official names of the animals in other Portuguese-speaking countries as well), including arara ("macaw"), jacaré ("South American caiman"), tucano ("toucan"), mandioca ("cassava"), abacaxi ("pineapple"), and many more. However, many Tupi–Guarani toponyms did not derive directly from Amerindian expressions, but were in fact coined by European settlers and Jesuit missionaries, who used the Língua Geral extensively in the first centuries of colonization. Many of the Amerindian words entered the Portuguese lexicon as early as in the 16th century, and some of them were eventually borrowed into other European languages.

African languages provided hundreds of words as well, especially in certain semantic domains, as in the following examples, which are also present in Portuguese:

- Food: quitute, quindim, acarajé, moqueca;
- Religious concepts: mandinga, macumba, orixá ("orisha"), axé;
- Afro-Brazilian music: samba, lundu, maxixe, berimbau;
- Body-related parts and conditions: banguela ("toothless"), bunda ("buttocks"), capenga ("lame"), caxumba ("mumps");
- Geographical features: cacimba ("well"), quilombo or mocambo ("runaway slave settlement"), senzala ("slave quarters");
- Articles of clothing: miçanga ("beads"), abadá ("capoeira or dance uniform"), tanga ("loincloth, thong");
- Miscellaneous household concepts: cafuné ("caress on the head"), curinga ("joker card"), caçula ("youngest child," also cadete and filho mais novo), and moleque ("brat, spoiled child," or simply "child," depending on the region).

Although the African slaves had various ethnic origins, by far most of the borrowings were contributed (1) by Bantu languages (above all, Kimbundu, from Angola, and Kikongo from Angola and the area that is now the Republic of the Congo and the Democratic Republic of the Congo), and (2) by Niger-Congo languages, notably Yoruba/Nagô, from what is now Nigeria, and Jeje/Ewe, from what is now Benin.

There are also many loanwords from other European languages, including English, French, German, and Italian. In addition, there is a limited set of vocabulary from Japanese.

Portuguese has borrowed a large number of words from English. In Brazil, these are especially related to the following fields (note that some of these words are used in other Portuguese-speaking countries):

- Technology and science: app, mod, layout, briefing, designer, slideshow, mouse, forward, revolver, relay, home office, home theater, bonde ("streetcar, tram," from 1860s company bonds), chulipa (also dormente, "sleeper"), bita ("beater," railway settlement tool), breque ("brake"), picape/pick-up, hatch, roadster, SUV, air-bag, guincho ("winch"), tilburí (19th century), macadame, workshop;
- Commerce and finance: commodities, debênture, holding, fundo hedge, angel, truste, dumping, CEO, CFO, MBA, kingsize, fast food ([ˈfɛstʃi ˈfudʒi]), delivery service, self service, drive-thru, telemarketing, franchise (also franquia), merchandising, combo, check-in, pet shop, sex shop, flat, loft, motel, suíte, shopping center/mall, food truck, outlet, tagline, slogan, jingle, outdoor, "outboard" ([awtʃiˈdɔʁ]), case (advertising), showroom;
- Sports: surf, skating, futebol [futʃiˈbɔw] ("soccer", or the calque ludopédio), voleibol, wakeboard, gol ("goal"), goleiro, quíper, chutar, chuteira, time ("team," [ˈtʃimi]), turfe, jockey club, cockpit, box (Formula 1), pódium, pólo, boxeador, MMA, UFC, rugby, match point, nocaute ("knockout"), poker, iate club, handicap;
- Miscellaneous cultural concepts: okay, gay, hobby, vintage, jam session, junk food, hot dog, bife or bisteca ("steak"), rosbife ("roast beef"), sundae, banana split, milkshake, (protein) shake, araruta ("arrowroot"), panqueca, cupcake, brownie, sanduíche, X-burguer, boicote ("boycott"), pet, Yankee, happy hour, lol, nerd [ˈnɛʁdʒi], geek (sometimes [ˈʒiki], but also [ˈɡiki]), noob, punk, skinhead ([skĩˈhɛdʒi]), emo ([ˈẽmu]), indie ([ˈĩdʒi]), hooligan, cool, vibe, hype, rocker, glam, rave, clubber, cyber, hippie, yuppie, hipster, overdose, junkie, cowboy, mullet, country, rockabilly, pin-up, socialite, playboy, sex appeal, striptease, after hours, drag queen, go-go boy, queer (as in "queer lit"), bear (also the calque urso), twink (also efebo/ephebe), leather (dad), footing (19th century), piquenique (also convescote), bro, rapper, mc, beatbox, break dance, street dance, free style, hang loose, soul, gospel, praise (commercial context, music industry), bullying [ˈbulĩ], stalking [isˈtawkĩ], closet, flashback, check-up, ranking, bondage, dark, goth (gótica), vamp, cueca boxer or cueca slip (male underwear), black tie (or traje de gala/cerimônia noturna), smoking ("tuxedo"), quepe, blazer, jeans, cardigã, blush, make-up artist, hair stylist, gloss labial (hybrid, also brilho labial), pancake ("facial powder," also pó de arroz), playground, blecaute ("blackout"), script, sex symbol, bombshell, blockbuster, multiplex, best-seller, it-girl, fail (web context), trolling (trollar), blogueiro, photobombing, selfie, sitcom, stand-up comedy, non-sense, non-stop, gamer, camper, crooner, backing vocal, roadie, playback, overdrive, food truck, monster truck, picape/pick-up (DJ), coquetel ("cocktail"), drinque, pub, bartender, barman, lanche ("portable lunch"), underground (cultural), flop (movie/TV context and slang), DJ, VJ, haole (slang, brought from Hawaii by surfers).

Many of these words are used throughout the Lusosphere.

French has contributed to Portuguese words for foods, furniture, and luxurious fabrics, as well as for various abstract concepts. Examples include hors-concours, chic, metrô, batom, soutien, buquê, abajur, guichê, içar, chalé, cavanhaque (from Louis-Eugène Cavaignac), calibre, habitué, clichê, jargão, manchete, jaqueta, boîte de nuit or boate, cofre, rouge, frufru, chuchu, purê, petit gâteau, pot-pourri, ménage, enfant gâté, enfant terrible, garçonnière, patati-patata, parvenu, détraqué, enquête, equipe, malha, fila, burocracia, birô, affair, grife, gafe, croquette, crocante, croquis, femme fatale, noir, marchand, paletó, gabinete, grã-fino, blasé, de bom tom, bon-vivant, guindaste, guiar, flanar, bonbonnière, calembour, jeu de mots, vis-à-vis, tête-à-tête, mecha, blusa, conhaque, mélange, bric-brac, broche, pâtisserie, peignoir, négliglé, robe de chambre, déshabillé, lingerie, corset, corselet, corpete, pantufas, salopette, cachecol, cachenez, cachepot, colete, colher, prato, costume, serviette, garde-nappe, avant-première, avant-garde, debut, crepe, frappé (including slang), canapé, paetê, tutu, mignon, pince-nez, grand prix, parlamento, patim, camuflagem, blindar (from German), guilhotina, à gogo, pastel, filé, silhueta, menu, maître d'hôtel, bistrô, chef, coq au vin, rôtisserie, maiô, bustiê, collant, fuseau, cigarette, crochê, tricô, tricot ("pullover, sweater"), calção, culotte, botina, bota, galocha, scarpin (ultimately Italian), sorvete, glacê, boutique, vitrine, manequim (ultimately Dutch), machê, tailleur, echarpe, fraque, laquê, gravata, chapéu, boné, edredom, gabardine, fondue, buffet, toalete, pantalon, calça Saint-Tropez, manicure, pedicure, balayage, limusine, caminhão, guidão, cabriolê, capilé, garfo, nicho, garçonete, chenille, chiffon, chemise, chamois, plissê, balonê, frisê, chaminé, guilhochê, château, bidê, redingote, chéri(e), flambado, bufante, pierrot, torniquete, molinete, canivete, guerra (Occitan), escamotear, escroque, flamboyant, maquilagem, visagismo, topete, coiffeur, tênis, cabine, concièrge, chauffeur, hangar, garagem, haras, calandragem, cabaré, coqueluche, coquine, coquette (cocotinha), galã, bas-fond (used as slang), mascote, estampa, sabotagem, RSVP, rendez-vous, chez..., à la carte, à la ..., forró, forrobodó (from 19th-century faux-bourdon).

Brazilian Portuguese tends to adopt French suffixes as in aterrissagem (Fr. atterrissage "landing [aviation]"), differently from European Portuguese (cf. Eur.Port. aterragem). Brazilian Portuguese (BP) also tends to adopt culture-bound concepts from French. That is the difference between BP estação ("station") and EP gare ("train station," Portugal also uses estação). BP trem is from English train (ultimately from French), while EP comboio is from Fr. convoi. An evident example of the dichotomy between English and French influences can be noted in the use of the expressions know-how, used in a technical context, and savoir-faire in a social context. Portugal uses the expression hora de ponta, from French l'heure de pointe, to refer to the "rush hour," while Brazil has horário de pico, horário de pique and hora do rush. Both bilhar, from French billiard, and the phonetic adaptation sinuca are used interchangeably for "snooker."

Contributions from German and Italian include terms for foods, music, the arts, and architecture.

From German, besides strudel, pretzel, bratwurst, kuchen (also bolo cuca), sauerkraut (also spelled chucrute from French choucroute and pronounced [ʃuˈkɾutʃi]), wurstsalat, sauerbraten, Oktoberfest, biergarten, zelt, Osterbaum, Bauernfest, Schützenfest, hinterland, Kindergarten, bock, fassbier and chope (from Schoppen), there are also abstract terms from German such as Prost, zum wohl, doppelgänger (also sósia), über, brinde, kitsch, ersatz, blitz ("police action"), and possibly encrenca ("difficult situation," perhaps from Ger. ein Kranker, "a sick person"). Xumbergar, brega (from marshal Friedrich Hermann Von Schönberg), and xote (musical style and dance) from schottisch. A significant number of beer brands in Brazil are named after German culture-bound concepts and place names because the brewing process was brought by German immigrants.

Italian loan words and expressions, in addition to those that are related to food or music, include tchau ("ciao"), nonna, nonnino, imbróglio, bisonho, entrevero, panetone, colomba, è vero, cicerone, male male, capisce, mezzo, va bene, ecco, ecco fatto, ecco qui, caspita, schifoso, gelateria, cavolo, incavolarsi, pivete, engambelar, andiamo via, tiramisu, tarantella, grappa, stratoria. Terms of endearment of Italian origin include amore, bambino/a, ragazzo/a, caro/a mio/a, tesoro, and bello/a; also babo, mamma, baderna (from Marietta Baderna), carcamano, torcicolo, casanova, noccia, noja, che me ne frega, io ti voglio tanto bene, and ti voglio bene assai.

Fewer words have been borrowed from Japanese. The latter borrowings are also mostly related to food and drink or culture-bound concepts, such as quimono, from Japanese kimono, karaokê, yakisoba, temakeria, sushi bar, mangá, biombo (from Portugal) (from byōbu, "folding screen"), jó ken pô or jankenpon ("rock-paper-scissors," played with the Japanese words being said before the start), saquê, sashimi, tempurá (a lexical "loan repayment" from a Portuguese loanword in Japanese), hashi, wasabi, johrei (religious philosophy), nikkei, gaijin ("non-Japanese"), issei ("Japanese immigrant"), as well as the different descending generations nisei, sansei, yonsei, gossei, rokussei and shichissei. Other Japanese loanwords include racial terms, such as ainoko ("Eurasian") and hafu (from English half); work-related, socioeconomic, historical, and ethnic terms limited to some spheres of society, including koseki ("genealogical research"), dekassegui ("dekasegi"), arubaito, kaizen, seiketsu, karoshi ("death by work excess"), burakumin, kamikaze, seppuku, harakiri, jisatsu, jigai, and ainu; martial arts terms such as karatê, aikidô, bushidô, katana, judô, jiu-jítsu, kyudô, nunchaku, and sumô; terms related to writing, such as kanji, kana, katakana, hiragana, and romaji; and terms for art concepts such as kabuki and ikebana. Other culture-bound terms from Japanese include ofurô ("Japanese bathtub"), Nihong ("target news niche and websites"), kabocha (type of pumpkin introduced in Japan by the Portuguese), reiki, and shiatsu. Some words have popular usage while others are known for a specific context in specific circles. Terms used among Nikkei descendants include oba-chan ("grandma"); onee-san, onee-chan, onii-san, and onii-chan; toasts and salutations such as kampai and banzai; and some honorific suffixes of address such as chan, kun, sama, san, and senpai.

Chinese contributed a few terms such as tai chi chuan and chá ("tea"), also in European Portuguese.

The loan vocabulary includes several calques, such as arranha-céu ("skyscraper," from French gratte-ciel) and cachorro-quente (from English hot dog) in Portuguese worldwide.

=== Other influences ===
Use of the reflexive me, especially in São Paulo and the South, is thought to be an Italianism, attributed to the large Italian immigrant population, as are certain prosodic features, including patterns of intonation and stress, also in the South and Southeast.

Other scholars, however, notably Naro & Scherre, have noted that the same or similar processes can be observed in the European variant, as well as in many varieties of Spanish, and that the main features of Brazilian Portuguese can be traced directly from 16th-century European Portuguese. In fact, they find many of the same phenomena in other Romance languages, including Aranese Occitan, French, Italian and Romanian; they explain these phenomena as due to natural Romance drift.

Naro and Scherre affirm that Brazilian Portuguese is not a "decreolized" form, but rather the "nativization" of a "radical Romanic" form. They assert that the phenomena found in Brazilian Portuguese are inherited from Classical Latin and Old Portuguese. According to another linguist, vernacular Brazilian Portuguese is continuous with European Portuguese, while its phonetics are more conservative in several aspects, characterizing the nativization of a koiné formed by several regional European Portuguese varieties brought to Brazil, modified by natural drift.

== Written and spoken languages ==
The written language taught in Brazilian schools has historically been based by law on the standard of Portugal and until the 19th century, Portuguese writers often were regarded as models by some Brazilian authors and university professors. However, this aspiration to unity was severely weakened in the 20th century by nationalist movements in literature and the arts, which awakened in many Brazilians a desire for a national style uninfluenced by the standards of Portugal. Later, agreements were reached to preserve at least an orthographic unity throughout the Portuguese-speaking world, including the African and Asian variants of the language (which are typically more similar to EP, due to a Portuguese presence lasting into the second half of the 20th century).

On the other hand, the spoken language was not subject to any of the constraints that applied to the written language, and consequently Brazilian Portuguese sounds different from any of the other varieties of the language. Brazilians, when concerned with pronunciation, look to what is considered the national standard variety, and never to the European one. This linguistic independence was fostered by the tension between Portugal and the settlers (immigrants) in Brazil from the time of the country's de facto settlement, as immigrants were forbidden to speak freely in their native languages in Brazil for fear of severe punishment by the Portuguese authorities. Lately, Brazilians in general have had some exposure to European speech, through TV and music. Often one will see Brazilian actors working in Portugal and Portuguese actors working in Brazil.

Modern Brazilian Portuguese has been highly influenced by other languages introduced by immigrants through the past century, specifically by German, Italian and Japanese immigrants. This high intake of immigrants not only caused the incorporation and/or adaptation of many words and expressions from their native language into local language, but also created specific dialects, such as the German Hunsrückisch dialect in the South of Brazil.

== Orthography ==
The written Brazilian standard differs from the European one to about the same extent that written American English differs from written British English. The differences extend to spelling, lexicon, and grammar. However, with the entry into force of the Orthographic Agreement of 1990 in Portugal and in Brazil since 2009, these differences were drastically reduced.

Several Brazilian writers have been awarded with the highest prize of the Portuguese language. The Camões Prize awarded annually by Portuguese and Brazilians is often regarded as the equivalent of the Nobel Prize in Literature for works in Portuguese.

Joaquim Maria Machado de Assis, João Guimarães Rosa, Carlos Drummond de Andrade, Graciliano Ramos, João Cabral de Melo Neto, Cecília Meireles, Clarice Lispector, José de Alencar, Rachel de Queiroz, Jorge Amado, Castro Alves, Antonio Candido, Autran Dourado, Rubem Fonseca, Lygia Fagundes Telles and Euclides da Cunha are Brazilian writers recognized for writing the most outstanding work in the Portuguese language.

=== Spelling differences ===
The Brazilian spellings of certain words differ from those used in Portugal and the other Portuguese-speaking countries. Some of these differences are merely orthographic, but others reflect true differences in pronunciation.

Until the implementation of the 1990 orthographic reform, a major subset of the differences related to the consonant clusters cc, cç, ct, pc, pç, and pt. In many cases, the letters c or p in syllable-final position have become silent in all varieties of Portuguese, a common phonetic change in Romance languages (cf. Spanish objeto, French objet). Accordingly, they stopped being written in BP (compare Italian spelling standards), but continued to be written in other Portuguese-speaking countries. For example, the word acção ("action") in European Portuguese became ação in Brazil, European óptimo ("optimum") became ótimo in Brazil, and so on, where the consonant was silent both in BP and EP, but the words were spelled differently. Only in a small number of words is the consonant silent in Brazil and pronounced elsewhere or vice versa, as in the case of BP fato, but EP facto. However, the new Portuguese language orthographic reform led to the elimination of the writing of the silent consonants also in the EP, making now the writing system virtually identical in all of the Portuguese-speaking countries.

However, BP has retained those silent consonants in a few cases, such as detectar ("to detect"). In particular, BP generally distinguishes in sound and writing between secção ("section" as in anatomy or drafting) and seção ("section" of an organization); whereas EP uses secção for both senses.

Another major set of differences is the BP usage of ô or ê in many words where EP has ó or é, such as BP neurônio / EP neurónio ("neuron") and BP arsênico / EP arsénico ("arsenic"). These spelling differences are due to genuinely different pronunciations. In EP, the vowels e and o may be open (é or ó) or closed (ê or ô) when they are stressed before one of the nasal consonants m, n followed by a vowel, but in BP they are always closed in this environment. The variant spellings are necessary in those cases because the general Portuguese spelling rules mandate a stress diacritic in those words, and the Portuguese diacritics also encode vowel quality.

Another source of variation is the spelling of the [ʒ] sound before e and i. By Portuguese spelling rules, that sound can be written either as j (favored in BP for certain words) or g (favored in EP). Thus, for example, we have BP berinjela / EP beringela ("eggplant").

== Language register – formal vs. informal ==
The linguistic situation of the BP informal speech in relation to the standard language is controversial. There are authors (Bortoni, Kato, Mattos e Silva, Bagno, Perini) who describe it as a case of diglossia, considering that informal BP has developed, both in phonetics and grammar, in its own particular way.

Accordingly, the formal register of Brazilian Portuguese has a written and spoken form. The written formal register (FW) is used in almost all printed media and written communication, is uniform throughout the country and is the "Portuguese" officially taught at school. The spoken formal register (FS) is essentially a phonetic rendering of the written form. (FS) is used in very formal situations, such as speeches or ceremonies or when reading directly out of a text. While (FS) is necessarily uniform in lexicon and grammar, it shows noticeable regional variations in pronunciation.

=== Characteristics of informal Brazilian Portuguese ===
The main and most general (i.e. not considering various regional variations) characteristics of the informal variant of BP are the following. While these characteristics are typical of Brazilian speech, some may also be present to varying degrees in other Lusophone areas, particular in Angola, Mozambique and Cabo Verde, which frequently incorporate certain features common to both the South American and European varieties. Although these characteristics would be readily understood in Portugal due to exposure to Brazilian media (and because they are observable in Portugal to some extent as well), other forms are preferred there (except the points concerning "estar" and "dar").

- dropping the first syllable of the verb estar ("[statal/incidental] to be") throughout the conjugation (ele tá ("he's") instead of ele está ("he is"), nós táva(mos/mo) ("we were") instead of nós estávamos ("we were"));
- dropping prepositions before subordinate and relative clauses beginning with conjunctions (Ele precisa que vocês ajudem instead of Ele precisa de que vocês ajudem);
- replacing haver when it means "to exist" with ter ("to have"): Tem muito problema na cidade ("There are many problems in the city") is much more frequent in speech than Há muitos problemas na cidade.
- lack of third-person object pronouns, which may be replaced by their respective subject pronouns or omitted completely (eu vi ele or even just eu vi instead of eu o vi for "I saw him/it")
- lack of second-person verb forms (except for some parts of Brazil) and, in various regions, plural third-person forms as well. For example tu cantas becomes tu canta or você canta (Brazilian uses the pronoun "você" a lot but "tu" is more localized. Some states never use it, but in some places such as Rio Grande do Sul, Ceará and Paraíba "você" is almost never used in informal speech, with "tu" being used instead, using both second and third-person forms depending on the speaker. In other places, such as Pernambuco, both "Tu" and "você" are used).
- lack of the relative pronoun cujo/cuja ("whose"), which is replaced by que ("that/which"), either alone (the possession being implied) or along with a possessive pronoun or expression, such as dele/dela (A mulher cujo filho morreu ("the woman whose son died") becomes A mulher que o filho [dela] morreu ("the woman that [her] son died"))
- frequent use of the pronoun a gente ("people") with 3rd p. sg verb forms instead of the 1st p. pl verb forms and pronoun nós ("we/us"), though both are formally correct and nós is still much used.
- obligatory proclisis in all cases (always me disseram, rarely disseram-me), as well as use of the pronoun between two verbs in a verbal expression (always vem me treinando, never me vem treinando or vem treinando-me)
- contracting certain high-frequency phrases, which is not necessarily unacceptable in standard BP (para > pra; dependo de ele ajudar > dependo 'dele' ajudar; com as > cas; deixa eu ver > xo vê/xeu vê; você está > cê tá etc.)
- preference for para over a in the directional meaning (Para onde você vai? instead of Aonde você vai? ("Where are you going?"))
- use of certain idiomatic expressions, such as Cadê o carro? instead of Onde está o carro? ("Where is the car?")
- lack of indirect object pronouns, especially lhe, which are replaced by para plus their respective personal pronoun (Dê um copo de água para ele instead of Dê-lhe um copo de água ("Give him a glass of water"); Quero mandar uma carta para você instead of Quero lhe mandar uma carta ("I want to send you a letter"))
- use of aí as a pronoun for indefinite direct objects (similar to French 'en'). Examples: fala aí ("say it"), esconde aí ("hide it"), pera aí (espera aí = "wait a moment");
- impersonal use of the verb dar ("to give") to express that something is feasible or permissible. Example: dá pra eu comer? ("can/may I eat it?"); deu pra eu entender ("I could understand"); dá pra ver um homem na foto instead of pode ver-se um homem na foto ("it's possible to see a man in the picture")
- though often regarded as "uneducated" by language purists, some regions and social groups tend to avoid "redundant" plural agreement in article-noun-verb sequences in the spoken language, since the plural article alone is sufficient to express plurality. Examples: os menino vai pra escola ("the[plural] boy goes to school") rather than os meninos vão para a escola ("the boys go to school"). Gender agreement, however, is always made even when plural agreement is omitted: os menino esperto (the smart boys) vs. as menina esperta (the smart girls).
- Use of a contraction of the imperative form of the verb "to look" ("olhar" = olha = ó) suffixed to adverbs of the place "aqui" and "ali" ("here" and "there") when directing someone's attention to something: "Olha, o carro dele 'tá ali-ó" (Look, his car's there/that's where his car is). When this is spoken reproduced in subtitles for audiovisual media, it is usually written in the non-contracted form ("aqui olha"), modern pronunciation notwithstanding.

== Grammar ==
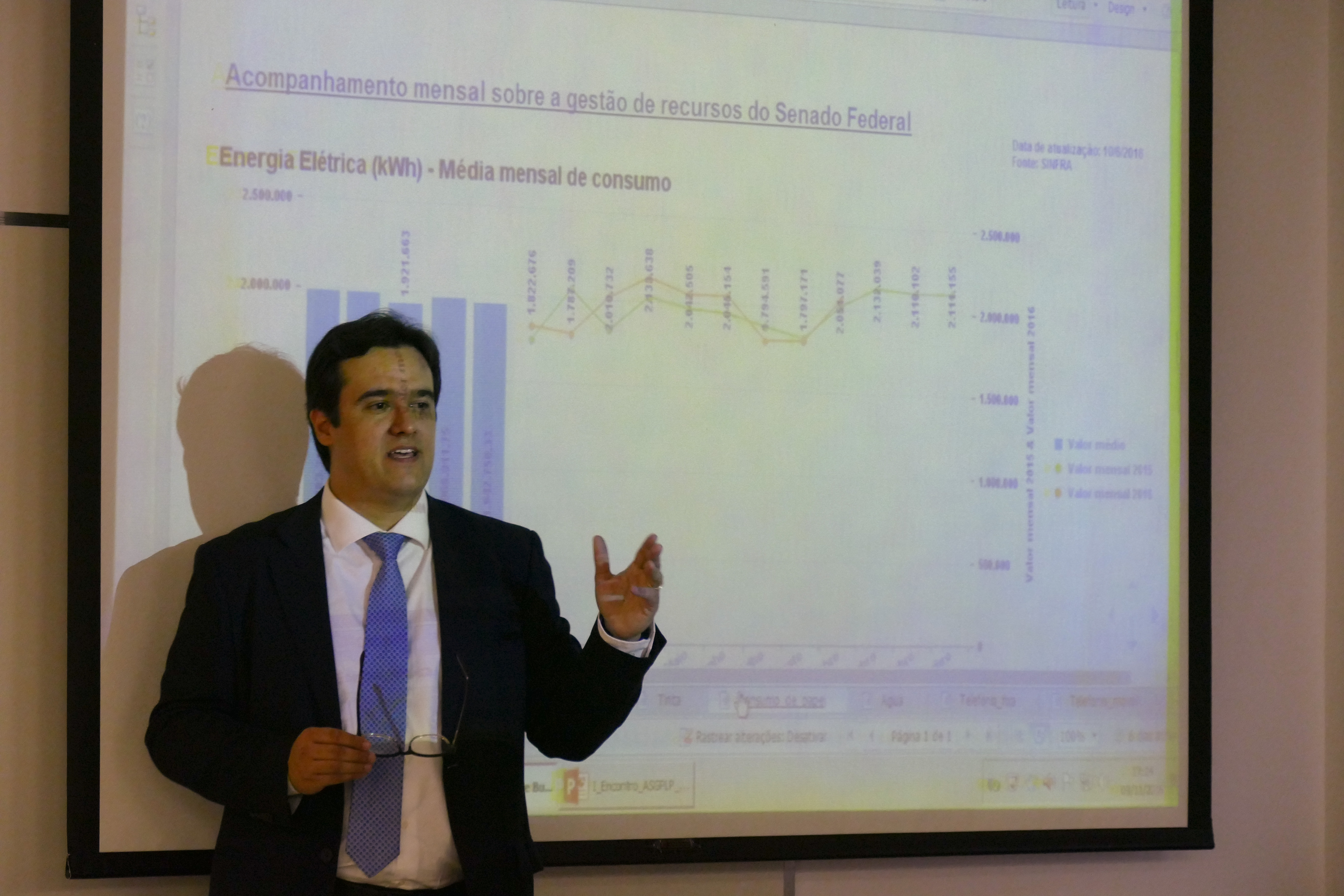
1st Strategic Management Meeting of the Association of Secretaries-General of Portuguese-Speaking Parliaments of 2016, in Brasília.

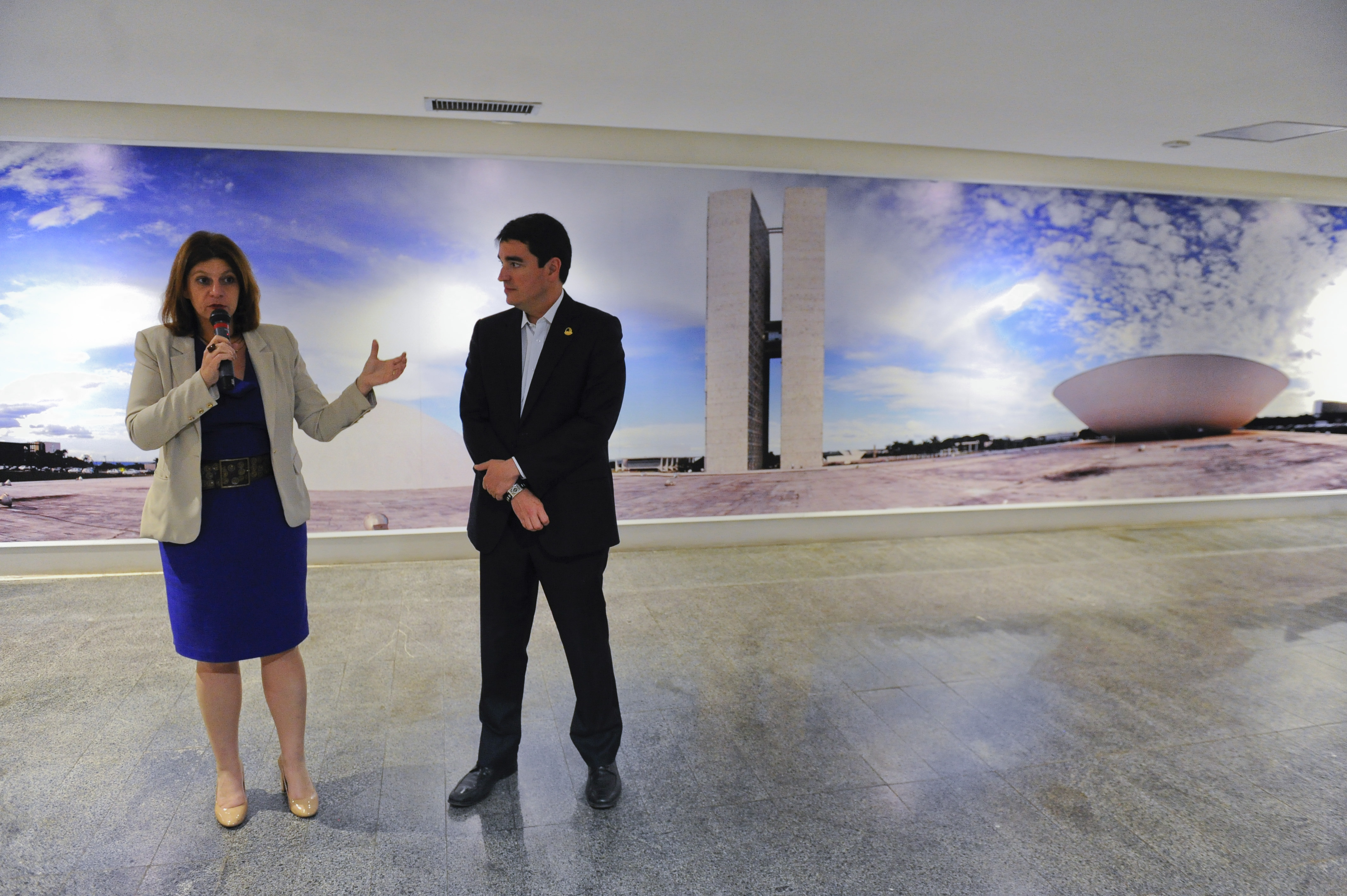
In Brasília, the Chamber of Deputies and the Senate jointly hold the "2017 Meeting of Management, Finance and Human Resources Staff" of the Association of Secretaries-General of Portuguese-speaking Parliaments with the aim of sharing experiences and work models related to organizational and administrative management in parliaments, human resources management, planning and financial management in the legislature, among other matters relevant to the topic. The event has the presence of representatives from all Portuguese-speaking countries.

=== Syntactic and morphological features ===
==== Topic-prominent language ====
Modern linguistic studies have shown that Brazilian Portuguese is a topic-prominent or topic- and subject-prominent language. Sentences with topic are extensively used in Portuguese, perhaps more in Brazilian Portuguese most often by means of turning an element (object or verb) in the sentence into an introductory phrase, on which the body of the sentence constitutes a comment (topicalization), thus emphasizing it, as in Esses assuntos eu não conheço bem, literally, "These subjects I don't know [them] well" (although this sentence would be perfectly acceptable in Portugal as well). In fact, in the Portuguese language, the anticipation of the verb or object at the beginning of the sentence, repeating it or using the respective pronoun referring to it, is also quite common, e.g. in Essa menina, eu não sei o que fazer com ela ("This girl, I don't know what to do with her") or Com essa menina eu não sei o que fazer ("With this girl I don't know what to do"). The use of redundant pronouns for means of topicalization is considered grammatically incorrect, because the topicalized noun phrase, according to traditional European analysis, has no syntactic function. This kind of construction, however, is often used in European Portuguese. Brazilian grammars traditionally treat this structure similarly, rarely mentioning such a thing as topic. Nevertheless, the so-called anacoluthon has taken on a new dimension in Brazilian Portuguese. The poet Carlos Drummond de Andrade once wrote a short metapoema (a metapoem, i. e., a poem about poetry, a specialty for which he was renowned) treating the concept of anacoluto:

[...] O homem, chamar-lhe mito não passa de anacoluto (The man, calling him myth is nothing more than an anacoluthon).

In colloquial language, this kind of anacoluto may even be used when the subject itself is the topic, only to add more emphasis to this fact, e.g. the sentence Essa menina, ela costuma tomar conta de cachorros abandonados ("This girl, she usually takes care of abandoned dogs"). This structure highlights the topic, and could be more accurately translated as "As for this girl, she usually takes care of abandoned dogs."

The use of this construction is particularly common with compound subjects, as in, e.g., Eu e ela, nós fomos passear ("She and I, we went for a walk"). This happens because the traditional syntax (Eu e ela fomos passear) places a plural-conjugated verb immediately following an argument in the singular, which may sound unnatural to Brazilian ears. The redundant pronoun thus clarifies the verbal inflection in such cases.

==== Progressive ====
Portuguese makes extensive use of verbs in the progressive aspect, almost as in English.

Brazilian Portuguese seldom has the present continuous construct estar a + infinitive, which, in contrast, has become quite common in European over the last few centuries. BP maintains the Classical Portuguese form of continuous expression, which is made by estar + gerund.

Thus, Brazilians will always write ela está dançando ("she is dancing"), not ela está a dançar. The same restriction applies to several other uses of the gerund: BP uses ficamos conversando ("we kept on talking") and ele trabalha cantando ("he sings while he works"), but rarely ficamos a conversar and ele trabalha a cantar as is the case in most varieties of EP.

BP retains the combination a + infinitive for uses that are not related to continued action, such as voltamos a correr ("we went back to running"). Some varieties of EP [namely from Alentejo, Algarve, Açores (Azores), and Madeira] also tend to feature estar + gerund, as in Brazil.

==== Personal pronouns ====
===== Syntax =====
In general, the dialects that gave rise to Portuguese had a flexible use of the object pronouns in the proclitic or enclitic positions. In Classical Portuguese, the use of proclisis was very extensive, while, on the contrary, in modern European Portuguese the use of enclisis has become predominant.

BP normally places the object pronoun before the verb (proclitic position), as in ele me viu ("he saw me"). In many such cases, the proclisis would be considered awkward or even grammatically incorrect in EP, in which the pronoun is generally placed after the verb (enclitic position), namely ele viu-me. However, formal BP still follows EP in avoiding starting a sentence with a proclitic pronoun, so both will have Deram-lhe o livro ("They gave him/her the book") instead of Lhe deram o livro, though it will seldom be spoken in BP (but would be clearly understood). The first-person singular proclitic pronoun frequently occurs at the beginning of a phrase in informal BP when it precedes an imperative, for example, Me olha ("Look at me"), Me avisa quando vocês chegarem em casa ("Let me know when you (pl.) get home").

In complex verbal predicates, BP normally has the object pronoun intervening between the auxiliary verb and the main one (ela vem me pagando but not ela me vem pagando or ela vem pagando-me). In some cases, to adapt this use to the standard grammar, some Brazilian scholars recommend that ela vem me pagando should be written ela vem-me pagando (as in EP), in which case the enclisis could be totally acceptable if there were no factor of proclisis. Therefore, this phenomenon may or not be considered improper according to the prescribed grammar, since, according to the case, there could be a factor of proclisis that would not permit the placement of the pronoun between the verbs (e.g. when there is a negative particle near the pronoun, in which case the standard grammar prescribes proclisis: ela não me vem pagando and not ela não vem-me pagando). Nevertheless, nowadays it is becoming perfectly acceptable to use a clitic between two verbs without linking it with a hyphen (as in poderia se dizer, or não vamos lhes dizer), and this usage (known as pronome solto entre dois verbos) can be found in modern(ist) literature, textbooks, magazines and newspapers like Folha de S.Paulo and O Estadão (see in-house style manuals of these newspapers, available on-line, for more details).

===== Contracted forms =====
BP rarely uses the contracted combinations of direct and indirect object pronouns which are sometimes used in EP, such as me + o = mo, lhe + as = lhas. Instead, the indirect clitic is replaced by preposition + strong pronoun: thus BP writes ela o deu para mim ("she gave it to me") instead of EP ela deu-mo; the latter most probably will not be understood by Brazilians, being obsolete in BP.

===== Mesoclisis =====
The mesoclitic placement of pronouns (between the verb stem and its inflection suffix) is viewed as archaic in BP, and therefore is restricted to very formal situations or stylistic texts. Hence the phrase Eu dar-lhe-ia, still current in EP, would be normally written Eu lhe daria in BP. Incidentally, a marked fondness for enclitic and mesoclitic pronouns was one of the many memorable eccentricities of former Brazilian President Jânio Quadros, as in his famous quote Bebo-o porque é líquido, se fosse sólido comê-lo-ia ("I drink it [liquor] because it is liquid, if it were solid I would eat it")

=== Preferences ===
There are many differences between formal written BP and EP that are simply a matter of different preferences between two alternative words or constructions that are both officially valid and acceptable.

==== Simple versus compound tenses ====
A few synthetic tenses are usually replaced by compound tenses, such as in:

future indicative: eu cantarei (simple), eu vou cantar (compound, ir + infinitive)
conditional: eu cantaria (simple), eu iria/ia cantar (compound, ir + infinitive)
past perfect: eu cantara (simple), eu tinha cantado (compound, ter + past participle)

Also, spoken BP usually uses the verb ter ("own", "have", sense of possession) and rarely haver ("have", sense of existence, or "there to be"), especially as an auxiliary (as it can be seen above) and as a verb of existence.

written: ele havia/tinha cantado (he had sung)
spoken: ele tinha cantado

written: ele podia haver/ter dito (he might have said)
spoken: ele podia ter dito

This phenomenon is also observed in Portugal.

== Phonology and differences in formal spoken language ==
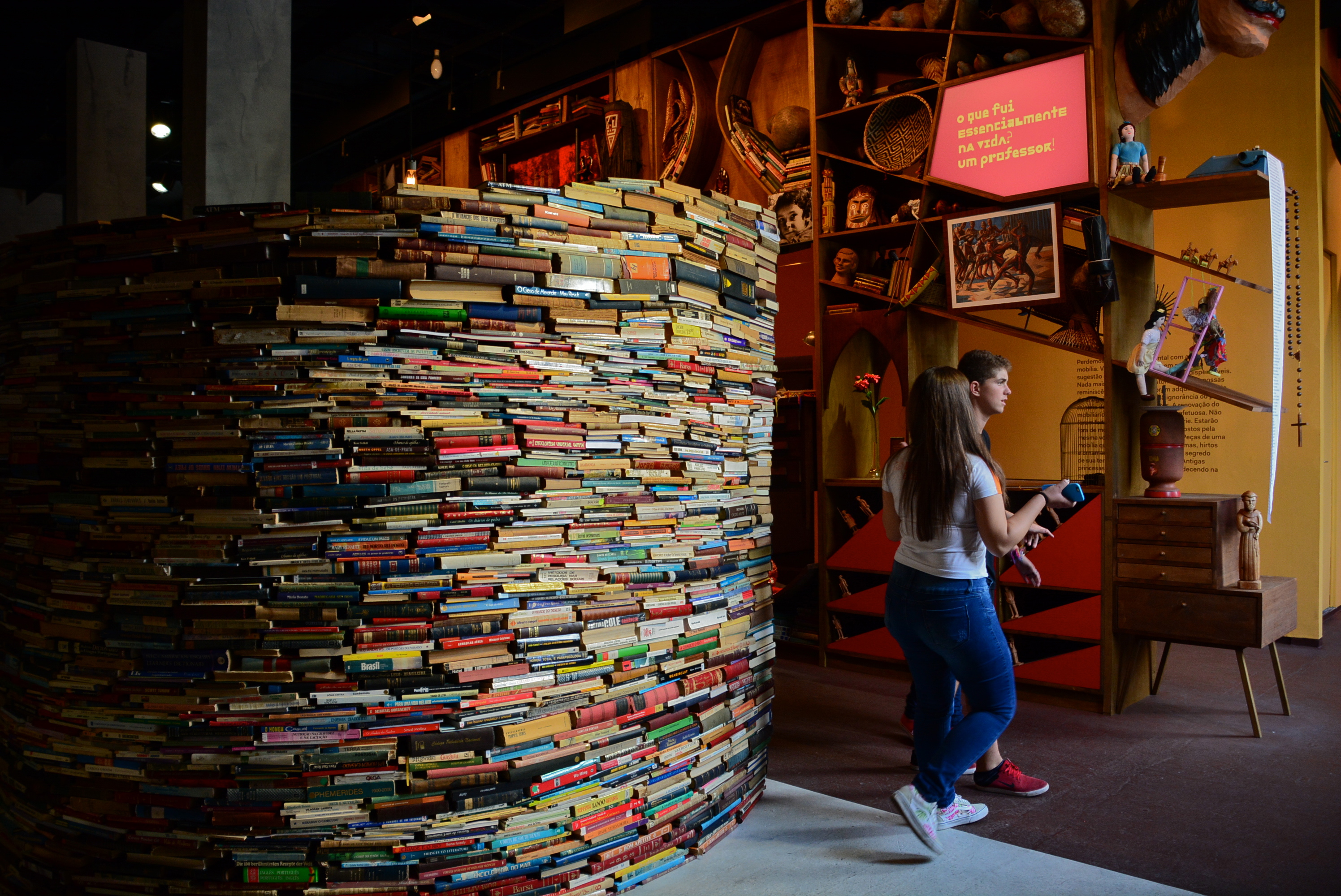
Books on the Museum of the Portuguese Language in São Paulo.

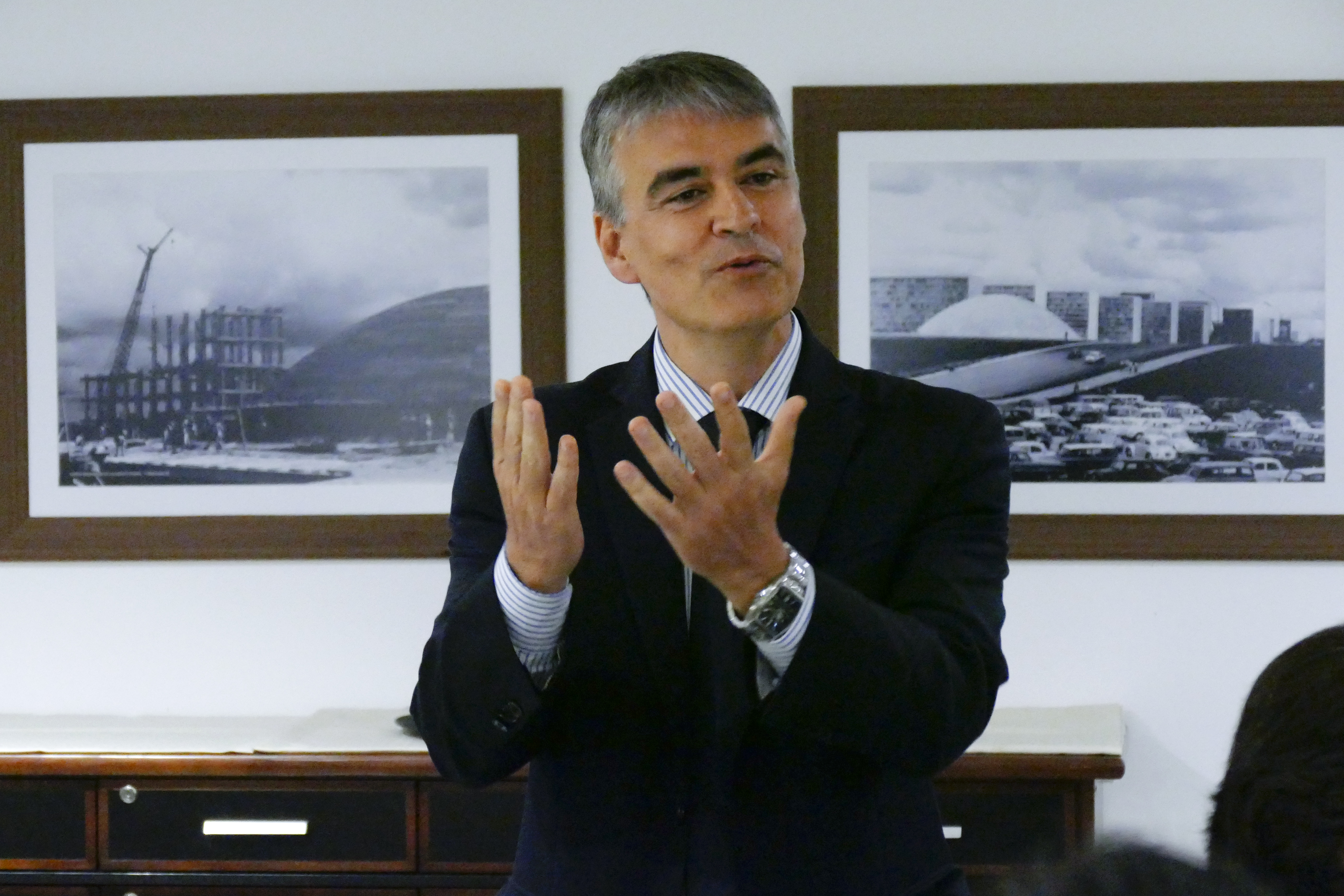
Members of the First Strategic Management Meeting of the Association of Secretaries-General of Portuguese-Speaking Parliaments participate in a dinner in 2016, in Brasília.

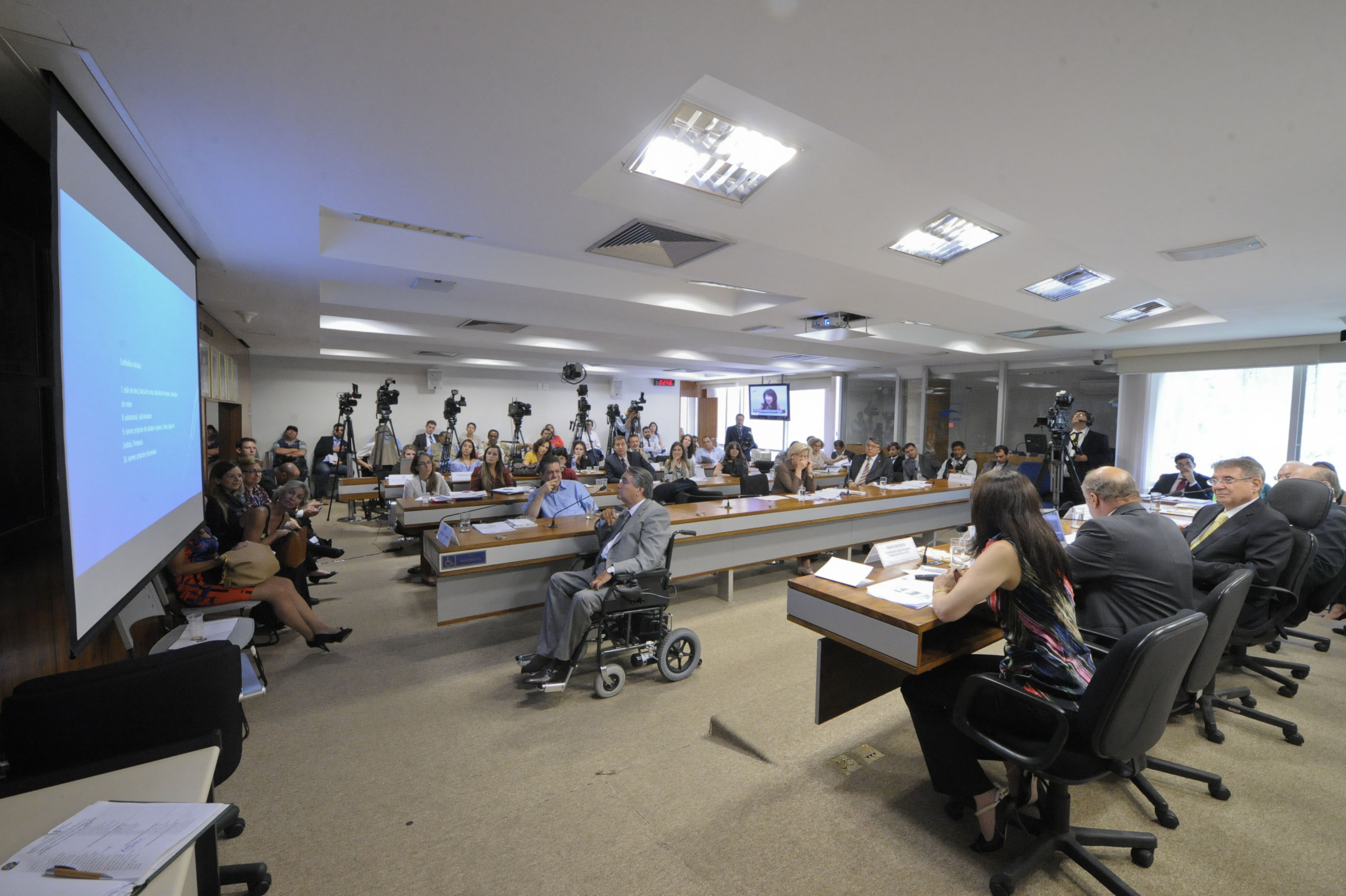
Senate of Brazil committee room during a meeting of the Education, Culture and Sport Committee in 2014. The committee holds a public hearing to discuss the Orthographic Agreement for the Portuguese Language, signed in 1990 and implemented in January 2016. The new rules must apply for the eight countries that have Portuguese as an official language, including Brazil, Portugal, etc.

In many ways, Brazilian Portuguese (BP) is conservative in its phonology. This is also true of Angolan and São Tomean Portuguese, as well as other African dialects. Brazilian Portuguese has eight oral vowels, five nasal vowels, and several diphthongs and triphthongs, some oral and some nasal.

=== Vowels ===
Oral vowels
	Front	Central	Back
Close	i		u
Close-mid	e		o
Open-mid	ɛ	ɐ	ɔ
Open		a	

Oral diphthongs
		Endpoint	
		/j/	/w/
Start point	/a/	aj	aw
Start point	/ɛ/	ɛj	ɛw
Start point	/e/	ej	ew
Start point	/i/	ij	iw
Start point	/ɔ/	ɔj	ɔw
Start point	/o/	oj	ow
Start point	/u/	uj	uw

Nasal vowels
	Front	Central	Back
Close	ĩ		ũ
Close-mid	ẽ		õ
Open		ɐ̃	

Nasal diphthongs
		Endpoint	
		/j̃/	/w̃/
Start point	/ɐ̃/	ɐ̃j̃	ɐ̃w̃
Start point	/ẽ/	(ẽj̃)	
Start point	/õ/	õj̃	(õw̃)
Start point	/ũ/	ũj̃	

- In vernacular varieties, the diphthong /ow/ is typically monophthongized to [o], e.g. sou /ˈsow/ > [ˈso].
- In vernacular varieties, the diphthong /ej/ is usually monophthongized to [e], depending on the speaker, e.g. ferreiro /feˈʁejɾu/ > [feˈʁeɾu].
- /y/ is found in French and German loanwords, though it is typically pronounced either /u/ or /i/

The reduction of vowels is one of the main phonetic characteristics of Portuguese generally, but in Brazilian Portuguese the intensity and frequency of that phenomenon varies significantly.

Vowels in Brazilian Portuguese generally are pronounced more openly than in European Portuguese, even when reduced. In syllables that follow the stressed syllable, ⟨o⟩ is generally pronounced as [u], ⟨e⟩ as [i], and ⟨a⟩ as [ɐ]. Some varieties of BP follow this pattern for vowels before the stressed syllable as well, whereas most varieties have the following five vowels before a stressed syllable: [u], [o], [a], [e] and [i].

The exact realization of the /ɐ/ varies somewhat amongst dialects. In BP, the vowel can be as high as [ə] in any environment. It is typically closer in stressed syllables before intervocalic nasals /m, n, ɲ/ than word-finally, reaching as open a position as [ɐ] in the latter case, and open-mid [ɜ] before nasals, where /ɐ/ is nasalized.

In contrast, speakers of European Portuguese pronounce unstressed ⟨a⟩ primarily as [ɐ], and they elide some unstressed vowels or reduce them to a short, near-close near-back unrounded vowel [ɨ], a sound that does not exist in BP. Thus, for example, the word setembro is [seˈtẽbɾu ~ sɛˈtẽbɾu] in BP, but [sɨˈtẽbɾu ~ ˈstẽbɾu] in European Portuguese.

The main difference among the dialects of Brazilian Portuguese is the frequent presence or absence of open vowels in unstressed syllables. In dialects of the South and Southeast, unstressed ⟨e⟩ and ⟨o⟩ (when they are not reduced to [i] and [u]) are pronounced as the close-mid vowels [e] and [o]. Thus, operação (operation) and rebolar (to shake one's body) may be pronounced [opeɾaˈsɐ̃w̃] and [ʁeboˈla(ʁ)]. Open-mid vowels can occur only in the stressed syllable. An exception is in the formation of diminutives or augmentatives. For example, cafezinho (demitasse coffee) and bolinha (little ball) are pronounced with open-mid vowels although these vowels are not in stressed position.

Meanwhile, in accents of the Northeast and North, in patterns that have not yet been much studied, the open-mid vowels [ɛ] and [ɔ] can occur in unstressed syllables in a large number of words. Thus, the above examples would be pronounced [ɔpɛɾaˈsɐ̃w̃] and [ʁɛbɔˈla(ʁ)].

Another difference between Northern/Northeastern dialects and Southern/Southeastern ones is the pattern of nasalization of vowels before ⟨m⟩ and ⟨n⟩. In all dialects and all syllables, orthographic ⟨m⟩ or ⟨n⟩ followed by another consonant represents nasalization of the preceding vowel. But when the ⟨m⟩ or ⟨n⟩ is syllable-initial (i.e. followed by a vowel), it represents nasalization only of a preceding stressed vowel in the South and Southeast, as compared to nasalization of any vowel, regardless of stress, in the Northeast and North. A famous example of this distinction is the word banana, which a Northeasterner would pronounce [bɐ̃ˈnɐ̃nɐ], while a Southerner would pronounce [baˈnɐ̃nɐ].

Vowel nasalization in some dialects of Brazilian Portuguese is very different from that of French, for example. In French, the nasalization extends uniformly through the entire vowel, whereas in the Southern-Southeastern dialects of Brazilian Portuguese, the nasalization begins almost imperceptibly and then becomes stronger toward the end of the vowel. In some cases, the nasal archiphoneme even entails the insertion of a nasal consonant such as [m, n, ŋ, ȷ̃, w̃, ɰ̃] (compare Polish phonology § Open), as in the following examples:

- banco [ˈbɐ̃kʊ ~ ˈbɐ̃ŋkʊ ~ ˈbɐ̃w̃kʊ ~ ˈbɐ̃ɰ̃kʊ]
- tempo [ˈtẽpʊ ~ ˈtẽmpʊ ~ ˈtẽȷ̃pʊ ~ ˈtẽɰ̃pʊ]
- pinta [ˈpĩta ~ ˈpĩnta]
- sombra [ˈsõbɾɐ ~ ˈsõmbɾɐ ~ ˈsõw̃bɾɐ ~ ˈsõɰ̃bɾɐ]
- mundo [ˈmũdʊ ~ ˈmũndʊ]

- fã [ˈfɐ̃ ~ ˈfɐ̃ŋ]
- bem [ˈbẽȷ̃ ~ ˈbẽɰ̃]
- vim [ˈvĩ ~ ˈvĩŋ]
- bom [ˈbõ ~ ˈbõw̃ ~ ˈbõɰ̃ ~ ˈbõŋ]
- um [ˈũ ~ ˈũŋ]

- mãe [ˈmɐ̃ȷ̃]
- pão [ˈpɐ̃w̃]
- põe [ˈpõȷ̃]
- muito [ˈmũj̃tʊ ~ ˈmũj̃ntʊ]

=== Consonants ===
Consonant phonemes
		Labial	Dental/ Alveolar	Retroflex	Palatal	Velar		Uvular	Glottal
		Labial	Dental/ Alveolar	Retroflex	Palatal	plain	labial	Uvular	Glottal
Nasal		m	n		ɲ ~ j̃				
Plosive/ Affricate	voiceless	p	t		(tʃ)	k	kʷ		
Plosive/ Affricate	voiced	b	d		(dʒ)	ɡ	ɡʷ		
Fricative	voiceless	f	s		ʃ			ʁ ~ h	
Fricative	voiced	v	z		ʒ			ʁ ~ h	
Approximant	median		(ɹ ~ ɻ) (Note: An English-like approximant [ɹ ~ ɻ] or vowel (R-colored vowel) occurs elsewhere in São Paulo as well as Mato Grosso do Sul, southern Goiás, central and southern Mato Grosso and bordering regions of Minas Gerais, as well as in the urban areas in the Sinos River Valley and some other parts of southern Brazil, usually pronounced as [χ] [h] [x] [ɾ] [ɦ] in other dialects. This pronunciation is stereotypically associated with the rural "caipira" dialect but it has spread since then and it is spoken in some other dialects as well.)		j		w		
Approximant	lateral		l		ʎ				
Tap			ɾ						

==== Palatalization of /di/ and /ti/ ====
One of the most noticeable tendencies of modern BP is the palatalization of /d/ and /t/ by most regions, which are pronounced [dʒ] and [tʃ], respectively, before /i/. The word presidente "president," for example, is pronounced [pɾeziˈdẽtʃi] in these regions of Brazil but [pɾɨziˈðẽt(ɨ)] in Portugal.

The pronunciation probably began in Rio de Janeiro and is often still associated with this city but is now standard in many other states and major cities, such as Belo Horizonte and Salvador, and it has spread more recently to some regions of São Paulo (because of migrants from other regions), where it is common in most speakers under 40 or so.

It has always been standard in Brazil's Japanese community since it is also a feature of Japanese.

The regions that still preserve the unpalatalized [ti] and [di] are mostly in the Northeast and South of Brazil by the stronger influence from European Portuguese (Northeast), and from Italian and Argentine Spanish (South).

==== Palatalization of /li/ and /ni/ ====
Another common change that differentiates Brazilian Portuguese from other dialect groups is the palatalization of /n/ and /l/ followed by the vowel /i/, yielding [nʲ ~ ɲ] and [lʲ ~ ʎ]. menina, "girl" [miˈnĩnɐ ~ miˈnʲĩnɐ ~ miˈɲĩnɐ]; Babilônia, "Babylon" [babiˈlõniɐ ~ babiˈlõnʲɐ ~ babiˈlõɲɐ]; limão, "lemon" [liˈmɐ̃w̃ ~ lʲiˈmɐ̃w̃ ~ ʎiˈmɐ̃w̃]; sandália, "sandal" [sɐ̃ˈdaliɐ ~ sɐ̃ˈdalʲɐ ~ sɐ̃ˈdaʎɐ].

==== Epenthetic glide before final /s/ ====
A change that is in the process of spreading in BP and perhaps started in the Northeast is the insertion of [j] after stressed vowels before /s/ at the end of a syllable. It began in the context of /a/ (mas "but" is now pronounced [majs] in most of Brazil, making it homophonous with mais "more").

Also, the change is spreading to other final vowels, and at least in the Northeast and the Southeast, the normal pronunciation of voz "voice" is /vɔjs/. Similarly, três "three" becomes /tɾejs/, making it rhyme with seis "six" /sejs/; this may explain the common Brazilian replacement of seis with meia ("half", as in "half a dozen") when pronouncing phone numbers.

==== Epenthesis in consonant clusters ====
BP tends to break up consonant clusters, if the second consonant is not /ɾ/, /l/, or /s/, by inserting an epenthetic vowel, /i/, which can also be characterized, in some situations, as a schwa. The phenomenon happens mostly in the pretonic position and with the consonant clusters ks, ps, bj, dj, dv, kt, bt, ft, mn, tm and dm: clusters that are not very common in the language ("afta": [ˈaftɐ > ˈafitɐ]; "opção" : [opˈsɐ̃w̃] > [opiˈsɐ̃w̃]).

However, in many regions of Brazil, there has been an opposite tendency to reduce the unstressed /i/ into a very weak vowel so partes or destratar are often realized similarly to [pahts] and [dstɾaˈta]. Sometimes, the phenomenon occurs even more intensely in unstressed posttonic vowels (except the final ones) and causes the reduction of the word and the creation of new consonant clusters ("prática" [ˈpɾatʃikɐ > ˈpɾatʃkɐ]; "máquina" [ˈmakinɐ > maknɐ]; "abóbora" [aˈbɔboɾɐ > aˈbɔbɾɐ]; "cócega" [ˈkɔsegɐ > ˈkɔsgɐ]).

==== L-vocalization and suppression of final r ====
The syllable-final /l/ is pronounced [w], and the syllable-final rhotic is the hard /ʁ/ or /h/ ~ /ɦ/ and other common allophones in the North and Northeast and most of the Southeast, while the city of São Paulo and the South conserve the tap /ɾ/ and most of the state of São Paulo (including parts of the city) and Central-West use /ɹ/ ~ /ɻ/. This, along with other adaptations, sometimes results in rather striking transformations of common loanwords.

The brand name "McDonald's," for example, is rendered [mɛk(i)ˈdõnawdʒ(i)s], and the word "rock" (the music) is rendered as [ˈʁɔk(i)]. Given that historical /n/ and /m/ no longer appear in syllable-final position (having been replaced by nasalization of the preceding vowel), these varieties of BP have come to strongly favor open syllables.

A related aspect of BP is the suppression of the phrase-final rhotic, even in formal speech, except before a word-initial vowel. Compare matar [maˈta] 'to kill' with matar o tempo [maˈtaɾ u ˈtẽpu] 'to kill time'. The same suppression also happens occasionally in EP, but much less often than in BP. (Compare: linking r in non-rhotic English dialects).

==== Nasalization ====
Nasalization is very common in many BP dialects and is especially noticeable in vowels before /n/ or /m/ in the syllable onset. For the same reason, open vowels (which are not normally under nasalization in Portuguese) cannot occur before /n/ or /m/ in BP, but can in EP. This nasalization sometimes affects the spelling of words. For example, harmónico "harmonic" [ɐɾˈmɔniku] is harmônico [aɾˈmõniku] in BP. It also can affect verbal paradigms: Portuguese distinguishes falamos "we speak" [fɐˈlɐ̃muʃ] from 'falámos' [fɐˈlamuʃ] "we spoke," but in BP, it is written and pronounced falamos [faˈlɐ̃mus] for both.

Related is the difference in pronunciation of the consonant represented by nh in most BP dialects. It is always [ɲ] in Portuguese, but in most regions of Brazil, it represents a nasalized semivowel [j̃], which nasalizes the preceding vowel as well: manhãzinha [mɐ̃j̃ɐ̃zĩj̃ɐ] ("early morning").

==== Palatalization of the syllable-final sibilants ====
European Portuguese consistently realizes the syllable-final sibilants as palatal /ʃ, ʒ/ (depending on the voicing of the following sound), while most dialects of BP maintain them as dentals. Whether such a change happens in BP is highly variable according to dialect. Rio de Janeiro and a few states in the Northeast are particularly known for such pronunciation; São Paulo, on the other hand, along with most other Brazilian dialects, is particularly known for lacking it.

In the Northeast, it is more likely to happen before a consonant than word-finally, and it varies from region to region. Some dialects (such as that of Pernambuco) have the same pattern as Rio, while in several other dialects (such as that of Ceará), the palatal /ʃ, ʒ/ replace /s, z/ only before the consonants /t/ and /d/.

==== Brazilian rhotics ====
In addition to the phonemic variation between /ʁ/ and /ɾ/ between vowels, up to four allophones of the "merged" phoneme /R/ are found in other positions:

1. A "soft" allophone /ɾ/ in syllable-onset clusters, as described above;
2. A default "hard" allophone in most other circumstances;
3. In some dialects, a special allophone syllable-finally (i.e., preceded but not followed by a vowel);
4. Commonly in all dialects, deletion of the rhotic word-finally.

The default hard allophone is some sort of voiceless fricative in most dialects, e.g., [χ] [h] [x], although other variants are also found. For example, an alveolar trill [r] is found in certain conservative dialects down São Paulo, of Italian-speaking, Spanish-speaking, Arabic-speaking, or Slavic-speaking influence. A uvular trill [ʀ] is found in areas of German-speaking, French-speaking, and Portuguese-descended influence throughout coastal Brazil down Espírito Santo, most prominently in parts of Rio de Janeiro.

The syllable-final allophone shows the greatest variation:

- Many dialects (mainly in Brasília, Minas Gerais and Brazilian North and Northeast) use the same voiceless fricative as in the default allophone. This may become voiced before a voiced consonant, esp. in its weaker variants (e.g., dormir [doɦˈmi(h)] 'to sleep').
- The soft [ɾ] occurs for many speakers in Southern Brazil and São Paulo city.
- An English-like approximant [ɹ ~ ɻ] or vowel (R-colored vowel) occurs elsewhere in São Paulo as well as Mato Grosso do Sul, southern Goiás, central and southern Mato Grosso and bordering regions of Minas Gerais, as well as in the urban areas in the Sinos River Valley and some other parts of southern Brazil. This pronunciation was stereotypically associated with the Caipira dialect but it has spread since then and it is spoken in other dialects as well.

==== Other phonetic changes ====
Several sound changes that historically affected European Portuguese were not shared by BP. Consonant changes in European Portuguese include the weakening of /b/, /d/, and /ɡ/ to fricatives [β], [ð], and [ɣ], while in BP these phonemes are maintained as stops in all positions. A vowel change in European Portuguese that does not occur in BP is the lowering of /e/ to /ɐ/ before the palatals (/ʃ, ʒ, ɲ, ʎ, j/) and in the diphthong em /ẽj̃/, which merges with the diphthong ãe /ɐ̃j̃/ normally, but not in BP.

== Differences in the informal spoken language ==
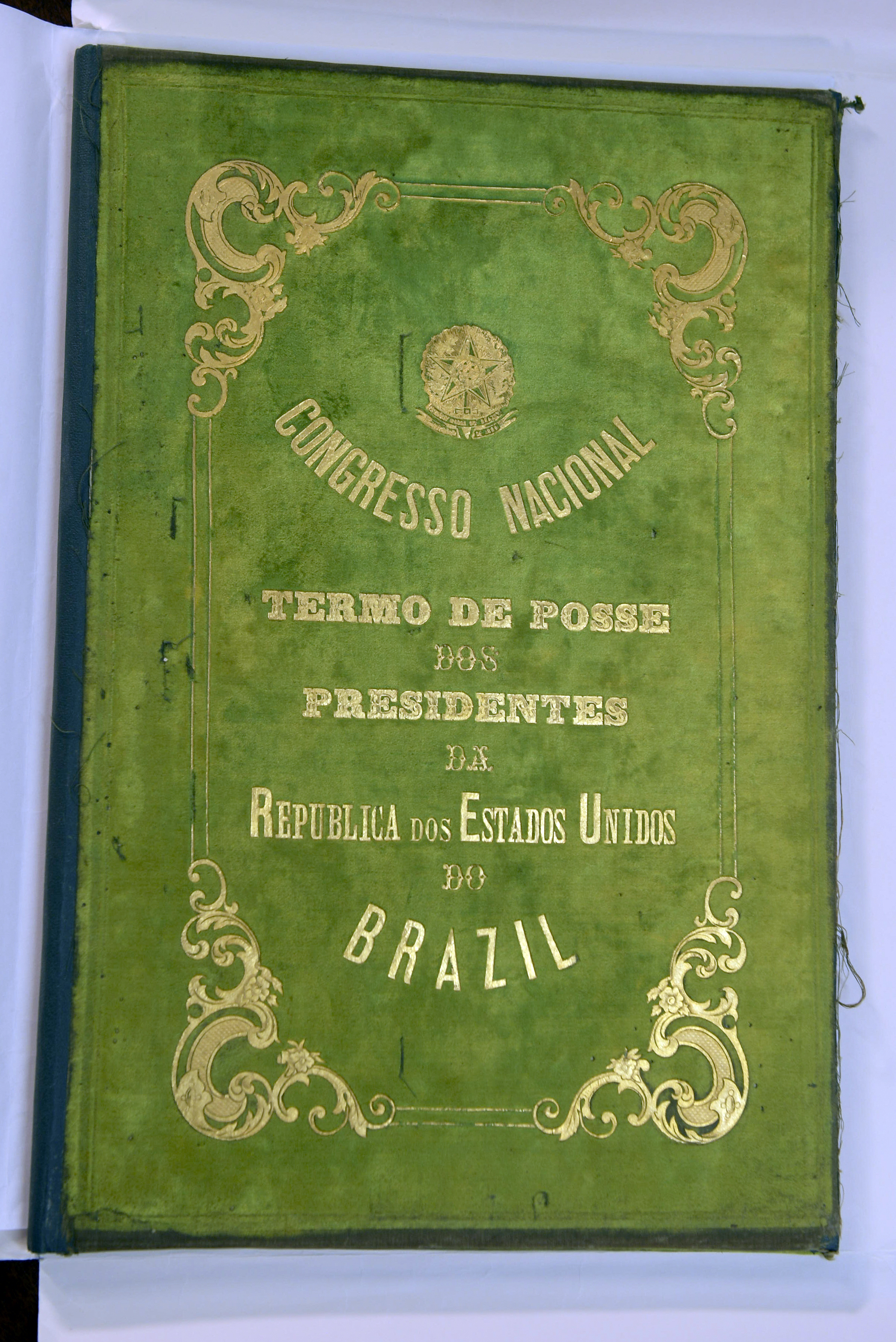
The Senate of Brazil preserves the books that record presidential inaugurations since 1891. By signing the book, the president-elect assumes the commitment to govern the country and defend the Constitution, continuing the timeline that has been traced since 26 February 1891. Access to the two volumes is restricted to protect the heritage. The documents are kept in the Senate Archives, in a room with temperature, humidity and light subject to strict parameters. Organized in two volumes by the Archive Coordination, these documents testify to the historical evolution of the Portuguese language, based on elements such as the successive loss of archaisms. This cover book shows: "Term of Inauguration of the presidents of the Republic of the United States of Brazil." When "United States" of Brazil was still used with the letter Z, and not Brasil with the letter S.

There are various differences between European Portuguese and Brazilian Portuguese, such as the dropping of the second-person conjugations (and, in some dialects, of the second-person pronoun itself) in everyday usage and the use of subject pronouns (ele, ela, eles, elas) as direct objects.

=== Grammar ===
Spoken Brazilian Portuguese usage differs from Standard Portuguese usage. The differences include the placement of clitic pronouns and, in Brazil, the use of subject pronouns as objects in the third person. Nonstandard verb inflections are also common in colloquial Brazilian Portuguese.

==== Affirmation and negation ====
Spoken Portuguese rarely uses the affirmation adverb sim ("yes") in informal speech. Instead, the usual reply is a repetition of the verb of the question (as in the Celtic languages):

BP:

— Você foi na/à/pra biblioteca?
— Fui.

or

— Tu foste/foi na/à/pra biblioteca?
— Fui.

Translation

"Have you gone to the library yet?"
"I went there."

In BP, it is common to form a yes–no question as a declarative sentence followed by the tag question não é? ("isn't it?"), contracted in informal speech to né? (compare English "He is a teacher, isn't he?"). The affirmative answer to such a question is a repetition of the verb é:

BP:

— Ele não fez o que devia, né? ("He didn't do what he should have, did he?")

— É. ("Right, he didn't.")

or

— Ela já foi atriz, né? ("She had already been an actress, hadn't she?")

— É. ("She already had.") Or – É, sim, ela já foi. (If a longer answer is preferred.)

It is also common to negate statements twice for emphasis, with não ("no") before and after the verb:

BP:

— Você fala inglês?
— Não falo, não.
"Do you speak English?"
"I don't speak [it], no."

Sometimes, even a triple negative is possible:

— Você fala inglês?
— Não. Não falo, não
"Do you speak English?"
"No. I don't speak it, no."

In some regions, the first "não" of a "não...não" pair is pronounced [nũ].

In some cases, the redundancy of the first não results in its omission, which makes BP a likely example of Jespersen's Cycle:

BP:

— Você fala inglês?

— Falo não. ("[I] speak not")

Translation

"Do you speak English?"
"No, I don't."

==== Imperative ====
Standard Portuguese forms a command according to the grammatical person of the subject (who is ordered to do the action) by using either the imperative form of the verb or the present subjunctive. Thus, one should use different inflections according to the pronoun used as the subject: tu ('you', the grammatical second person with the imperative form) or você ('you', the grammatical third person with the present subjunctive):

Tu és burro, cala a boca! (cala-te)
Você é burro, cale a boca! (cale-se)
"You are stupid, shut your mouth! (shut up)"

Currently, several dialects of BP have largely lost the second-person pronouns, but even they use the second-person imperative in addition to the third-person present subjunctive form that should be used with você:

BP: Você é burro, cale a boca! OR

BP: Você é burro, cala a boca! (considered grammatically incorrect, but completely dominant in informal language)

Brazilian Portuguese uses the second-person imperative forms even when referring to você and not tu, in the case of the verb ser 'to be (permanently)' and estar 'to be (temporarily)', the second-person imperative sê and está are never used; the third-person subjunctive forms seja and esteja may be used instead.

The negative command forms use the subjunctive present tense forms of the verb. However, as for the second person forms, Brazilian Portuguese traditionally does not use the subjunctive-derived ones in spoken language. Instead, they employ the imperative forms: "Não anda," rather than the grammatically correct "Não andes."

As for other grammatical persons, there is no such phenomenon because both the positive imperative and the negative imperative forms are from their respective present tense forms in the subjunctive mood: Não jogue papel na grama (Don't throw paper on the grass); Não fume (Don't smoke).

==== Deictics ====
In spoken Brazilian Portuguese, the first two adjectives/pronouns usually merge:

Esse 'this (one)' [near the speaker] / 'that (one)' [near the addressee]
Aquele 'that (one)' [away from both]

Example:

Essa é minha camiseta nova. (BP)
This is my new T-shirt.

Perhaps as a means of avoiding or clarifying some ambiguities created by the fact that "este" ([st] > [s]) and "esse" have merged into the same word, informal BP often uses the demonstrative pronoun with some adverb that indicates its placement in relation to the addressee: if there are two skirts in a room and one says, Pega essa saia para mim (Take this skirt for me), there may be some doubt about which of them must be taken so one may say Pega essa aí (Take this one there near you") in the original sense of the use of "essa", or Pega essa saia aqui (Take this one here).

==== Personal pronouns and possessives ====
===== Tu and você =====
In many dialects of BP, você (formal "you") replaces tu (informal "you"). The object pronoun, however, is still te ([tʃi], [te] or [ti]). Also, other forms such as teu (possessive), ti (postprepositional), and contigo ("with you") are still common in most regions of Brazil, especially in areas in which tu is still frequent.

Hence, the combination of object te with subject você in informal BP: eu te disse para você ir (I told you that you should go). In addition, in all the country, the imperative forms may also be the same as the formal second-person forms, but it is argued by some that it is the third-person singular indicative which doubles as the imperative: fala o que você fez instead of fale o que você fez ("say what you did").

In areas in which você has largely replaced tu, the forms ti/te and contigo may be replaced by você and com você. Therefore, either você (following the verb) or te (preceding the verb) can be used as the object pronoun in informal BP.

A speaker may thus end up saying "I love you" in two ways: eu amo você or eu te amo. In parts of the Northeast, most specifically in the states of Piauí and Pernambuco, it is also common to use the indirect object pronoun lhe as a second-person object pronoun: eu lhe amo.

In parts of the South, in most of the North and most of the Northeast, and in the city of Santos, the distinction between semi-formal 'você' and familiar 'tu' is still maintained, and object and possessive pronouns pattern likewise. In the Paraná state capital, Curitiba, 'tu' is not generally used.

In Rio de Janeiro and minor parts of the Northeast (interior of some states and some speakers from the coast, such as Recife), both tu and você (and associated object and possessive pronouns) are used interchangeably with little or no difference (sometimes even in the same sentence). In Salvador, tu is never used and is replaced by você.

Most Brazilians who use tu use it with the third-person verb: tu vai ao banco. "Tu" with the second-person verb can still be found in Maranhão, Pernambuco, Piauí, Santa Catarina, and in the Amazofonia dialect region (e.g. Manaus, Belém).

A few cities in Rio Grande do Sul (but in the rest of the state speakers may or may not use it in more formal speech), mainly near the border with Uruguay, have a slightly different pronunciation in some instances (tu vieste becomes tu viesse), which is also present in Santa Catarina and Pernambuco. In the states of Pará and Amazonas, tu is used much more often than você and is always accompanied by a second-person verb ("tu queres", tu "viste").

In São Paulo, the use of "tu" in print and conversation is no longer very common and is replaced by "você". However, São Paulo is now home to many immigrants of Northeastern origin, who may employ "tu" quite often in their everyday speech. Você is predominant in most of the Southeastern and Center Western regions; it is almost entirely prevalent in the states of Minas Gerais (apart from portions of the countryside, such as the region of São João da Ponte, where "tu" is also present) and Espírito Santo, but "tu" is frequent in Santos and all coastal region of São Paulo state as well as some cities in the countryside.

In most of Brazil "você" is often reduced to even more contracted forms, resulting ocê (mostly in the Caipira dialect) and, especially, cê because vo- is an unstressed syllable and so is dropped in rapid speech.

===== 2nd person singular conjugation in Brazilian Portuguese =====
The table for 2nd person singular conjugation in Brazilian Portuguese is presented below:

	você (standard)	você (colloquial)	tu (standard)	tu (colloquial)
Present indicative	fala		falas	fala
Past indicative	falou		falaste	falaste, falasse, falou
Imperfect subjunctive	falasse		falasses	falasse
Imperative positive	fale	fala, fale	fala	fala, fale
Imperative negative	não fale	não fale, não fala	não fales	não fale, não fala
Reflexive	se parece		te pareces	se parece, te parece

===== Third-person direct object pronouns =====
In spoken informal registers of BP, the third-person object pronouns 'o', 'a', 'os', and 'as' are virtually nonexistent and are simply left out or, when necessary and usually only when referring to people, replaced by stressed subject pronouns like ele "he" or isso "that": Eu vi ele "I saw him" rather than Eu o vi.

===== Seu and dele =====
When você is strictly a second-person pronoun, the use of possessive seu/sua may turn some phrases quite ambiguous since one would wonder whether seu/sua refers to the second person você or to the third person ele/ela.

BP thus tends to use the third-person possessive 'seu' to mean "your" since você is a third-person pronoun and uses 'dele', 'dela', 'deles', and 'delas' ("of him/her/them" and placed after the noun) as third-person possessive forms. If no ambiguity could arise (especially in narrative texts), seu is also used to mean 'his' or 'hers'.

Both forms ('seu' or 'dele(s) /dela(s)') are considered grammatically correct in Brazilian Portuguese.

===== Definite article before possessive =====
In Portuguese, one may or may not include the definite article before a possessive pronoun (meu livro or o meu livro, for instance). The variants of use in each dialect of Portuguese are mostly a matter of preference: it does not usually mean a dialect completely abandoned either form.

In Southeastern Brazilian Portuguese, especially in the standard dialects of the cities of Rio de Janeiro and São Paulo, the definite article is normally used as in Portugal, but many speakers do not use it at the beginning of the sentence or in titles: Minha novela, Meu tio matou um cara.

In Northeastern BP dialects and in Central and Northern parts of the state of Rio de Janeiro (starting from Niterói), rural parts of Minas Gerais, and all over Espírito Santo State, speakers tend to but do not always drop the definite article, but both esse é o meu gato and esse é meu gato are likely in speech.

Formal written Brazilian Portuguese tends, however, to omit the definite article in accordance with prescriptive grammar rules derived from Classical Portuguese even if the alternative form is also considered correct, but many teachers consider it inelegant.

===== Syntax =====
Some of the examples on the right side of the table below are colloquial or regional in Brazil. Literal translations are provided to illustrate how word order changes between varieties.

	Brazilian Portuguese (formal)	Brazilian Portuguese (colloquial)
placement of clitic pronouns	Eu te amo. "I you/thee love."	
placement of clitic pronouns	Responda-me! (você) "Answer me!" (you)	Me responda! (você)^{1} Me responde! (você)^{1} "Me to answer!" (you)
use of personal pronouns	Eu a vi. "I her saw."	Eu vi ela. "I saw she."

Word order in the first Brazilian Portuguese example is frequent in European Portuguese. Similar to the subordinate clauses like Sabes que eu te amo "You know that I love you," but not in simple sentences like "I love you."

However, in Portugal, an object pronoun would never be placed at the start of a sentence, as in the second example. The example in the bottom row of the table, with its deletion of "redundant" inflections, is considered ungrammatical, but it is nonetheless dominant in Brazil throughout all social classes.

==== Use of prepositions ====
Just as in the case of English, whose various dialects sometimes use different prepositions with the same verbs or nouns (stand in/on line, in/on the street), BP usage sometimes requires prepositions that would not be normally used in Portuguese for the same context.

===== Chamar de =====
Chamar 'call' is normally used with the preposition de in BP, especially when it means 'to describe someone as':

Chamei ele de ladrão. (BP)
I called him a thief.

===== Em with verbs of movement =====
When movement to a place is described, BP uses em (contracted with an article, if necessary):

Fui na praça. (BP)
I went to the square. [temporarily]

In BP, the preposition para can also be used with such verbs with no difference in meaning:

Fui para a praça. (BP)
I went to the square. [definitively]

== Dialects ==
Percentage of worldwide Portuguese speakers per country.

Brazil, due to its continental size and the immigration to Brazil that colonized and populated the country for centuries, has different dialects throughout the national territory. The dialects usually differ in vocabulary, pronunciation and non-standard grammar usage specially in verb conjugation and pronoun usage system. Those differences aside, all dialects remain mutually intelligible.

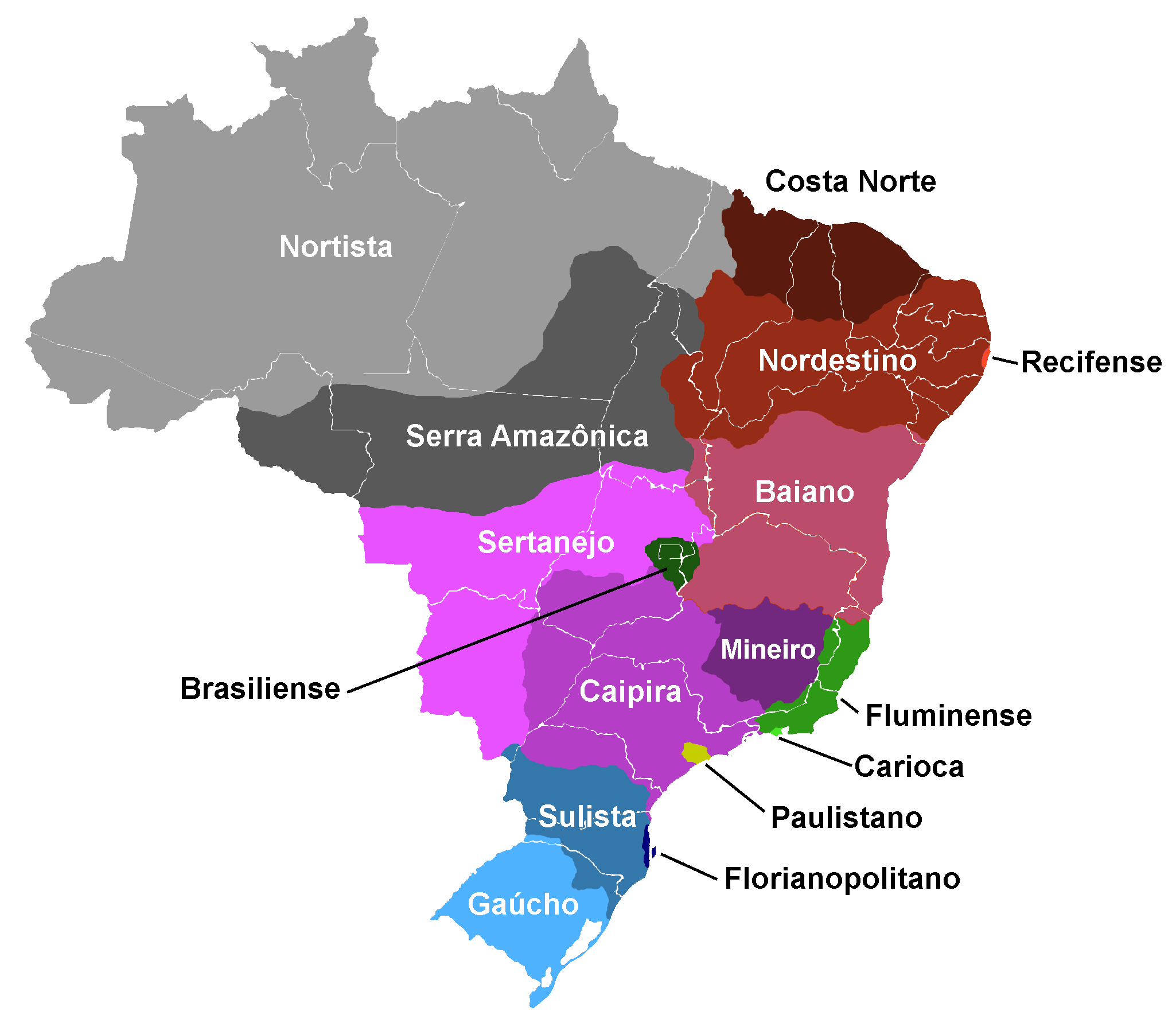
Map of Portuguese dialects in Brazil.

1. Caipira — Spoken in the states of São Paulo (mostly in the countryside and rural areas); southern Minas Gerais, northern Paraná and southeastern Mato Grosso do Sul. Depending on the vision of what constitutes caipira, Triângulo Mineiro, border areas of Goiás and the remaining parts of Mato Grosso do Sul are included, and the frontier of caipira in Minas Gerais is expanded further northerly, though not reaching metropolitan Belo Horizonte. It is often said that caipira appeared by decreolization of the língua brasílica and the related língua geral paulista, then spoken in almost all of what is now São Paulo, a former lingua franca in most of the contemporary Centro-Sul of Brazil before the 18th century, brought by the bandeirantes, interior pioneers of Colonial Brazil, closely related to its northern counterpart Nheengatu, and that is why the dialect shows many general differences from other variants of the language. It has striking remarkable differences in comparison to other Brazilian dialects in phonology, prosody and grammar, often stigmatized as being strongly associated with a substandard variant, now mostly rural.
2. Cearense or Costa norte — is a dialect spoken more sharply in the states of Ceará and Piauí. The variant of Ceará includes fairly distinctive traits it shares with the one spoken in Piauí, though, such as distinctive regional phonology and vocabulary (for example, a debuccalization process stronger than that of Portuguese, a different system of the vowel harmony that spans Brazil from fluminense and mineiro to amazofonia but is especially prevalent in nordestino, a very coherent coda sibilant palatalization as those of Portugal and Rio de Janeiro but allowed in fewer environments than in other accents of nordestino, a greater presence of dental stop palatalization to palato-alveolar in comparison to other accents of nordestino, among others, as well as a great number of archaic Portuguese words).
3. Baiano — Found in Bahia. Similar to nordestino, it has a very characteristic syllable-timed rhythm and the greatest tendency to pronounce unstressed vowels as open-mid [ɛ] and [ɔ].
4. Fluminense — A broad dialect with many variants spoken in the states of Rio de Janeiro, Espírito Santo and neighbouring eastern regions of Minas Gerais. Fluminense formed in these previously caipira-speaking areas due to the gradual influence of European migrants, causing many people to distance their speech from their original dialect and incorporate new terms. Fluminense is sometimes referred to as carioca, however carioca is a more specific term referring to the accent of the Greater Rio de Janeiro area by speakers with a fluminense dialect.
5. Sulriograndense or Gaúcho — in Rio Grande do Sul, similar to sulista. There are many distinct accents in Rio Grande do Sul, mainly due to the heavy influx of European immigrants of diverse origins who have settled in colonies throughout the state, and to the proximity to Spanish-speaking nations. The gaúcho word in itself is a Spanish loanword into Portuguese of obscure Indigenous Amerindian origins.
6. Mineiro — Minas Gerais in center, east and southeast regions. As the fluminense area, its associated region was formerly a sparsely populated land where caipira dialect was briefly spoken, but the discovery of gold and gems made it the most prosperous Brazilian region, which attracted Portuguese colonists and commoners – called emboabas – from other parts of Brazil along with their African slaves. In the beginning of the 18th Century, the caipiras fled from Minas Gerais after the War of the Emboabas, which lasted for two years (1707 to 1709). Central Minas Gerais, then, developed an autochthonous and endemic accent, spoken nowadays by half of its population. Southern and western areas of the state have a distinctive accent, caipira, and the northern area has an accent called geraizeiro. The sociolect of prestige of mineiro spoken in the state capital, Belo Horizonte, is the accent from Brazilian Portuguese that is the nearest to the artificial accent called Standard Brazilian Portuguese, in Portuguese named dialeto neutro. Standard Brazilian Portuguese is used in media (radio and television), like Received English and American Standard English. A 2023 study, conducted by a language learning app, showed that mineiro is the most charming dialect of Brazilian Portuguese.
7. Nordestino (Note: Note: the speaker of this sound file is from Rio de Janeiro, and he is talking about his experience with nordestino and nortista accents.) — more marked in the Sertão (7), where, in the 19th and 20th centuries and especially in the area including and surrounding the sertão (the dry land after Agreste) of Pernambuco and southern Ceará, it could sound less comprehensible to speakers of other Portuguese dialects than Galician or Rioplatense Spanish, and nowadays less distinctive from other variants in the metropolitan cities along the coasts. It can be divided in two regional variants: one that includes the northern Maranhão and southern of Piauí and another that goes from Ceará to Alagoas.
8. Nortista or Amazofonia — Most of Amazon Basin states i.e. Northern Brazil. Before the 20th century, most people from the nordestino area fleeing the droughts and their associated poverty settled here, so it has some similarities with the Portuguese dialect there spoken. The speech in and around the cities of Belém and Manaus has a more European flavor in phonology, prosody and grammar.
9. Paulistano — Variants spoken around Greater São Paulo in its maximum definition and more easterly areas of São Paulo state, as well perhaps "educated speech" from anywhere in the state of São Paulo (where it coexists with caipira). Caipira is the hinterland sociolect of much of the Central-Southern half of Brazil, nowadays conservative only in the rural areas and associated with them, that has a historically low prestige in cities as Rio de Janeiro, Curitiba, Belo Horizonte, and until some years ago, in São Paulo itself. Sociolinguistics, or what by times is described as 'linguistic prejudice', often correlated with classism, is a polemic topic in the entirety of the country since the times of Adoniran Barbosa. Also, the "Paulistano" accent was heavily influenced by the presence of immigrants in the city of São Paulo, especially the Italians.
10. Sertanejo — Center-Western states, and also much of Tocantins and Rondônia. It is closer to mineiro, caipira, nordestino or nortista depending on the location.
11. Sulista — The variants spoken in the areas between the northern regions of Rio Grande do Sul and southern regions of São Paulo state, encompassing most of southern Brazil. The city of Curitiba does have a fairly distinct accent as well, and a relative majority of speakers around and in Florianópolis also speak this variant (many speak florianopolitano or manezinho da ilha instead, related to the European Portuguese dialects spoken in Azores and Madeira). Speech of northern Paraná is closer to that of inland São Paulo.
12. Florianopolitano — Variants heavily influenced by European Portuguese spoken in Florianópolis city (due to a heavy immigration movement from Portugal, mainly its insular regions) and much of its metropolitan area, Grande Florianópolis, said to be a continuum between those whose speech most resemble sulista dialects and those whose speech most resemble fluminense and European ones, called, often pejoratively, manezinho da ilha.
13. Carioca — Not a dialect, but sociolects of the fluminense variant spoken in an area roughly corresponding to Greater Rio de Janeiro. It appeared after locals came in contact with the Portuguese aristocracy amidst the Portuguese royal family fled in the early 19th century. There is actually a continuum between vernacular countryside accents and the carioca sociolect, and the educated speech (in Portuguese norma culta, which most closely resembles other Brazilian Portuguese standards but with marked recent Portuguese influences, the nearest ones among the country's dialects along florianopolitano), so that not all people native to the state of Rio de Janeiro speak the said sociolect, but most carioca speakers will use the standard variant not influenced by it that is rather uniform around Brazil depending on context (emphasis or formality, for example).
14. Brasiliense — used in Brasília and its metropolitan area. It is not considered a dialect, but more of a regional variant – often deemed to be closer to fluminense than the dialect commonly spoken in most of Goiás, sertanejo.
15. Arco do desflorestamento or serra amazônica — Known in its region as the "accent of the migrants," it has similarities with caipira, sertanejo and often sulista that make it differing from amazofonia (in the opposite group of Brazilian dialects, in which it is placed along nordestino, baiano, mineiro and fluminense). It is the most recent dialect, which appeared by the settlement of families from various other Brazilian regions attracted by the cheap land offer in recently deforested areas.
16. Recifense — used in Recife and its metropolitan area.

== Diglossia ==
Wikipedia em Português. A enciclopédia livre.

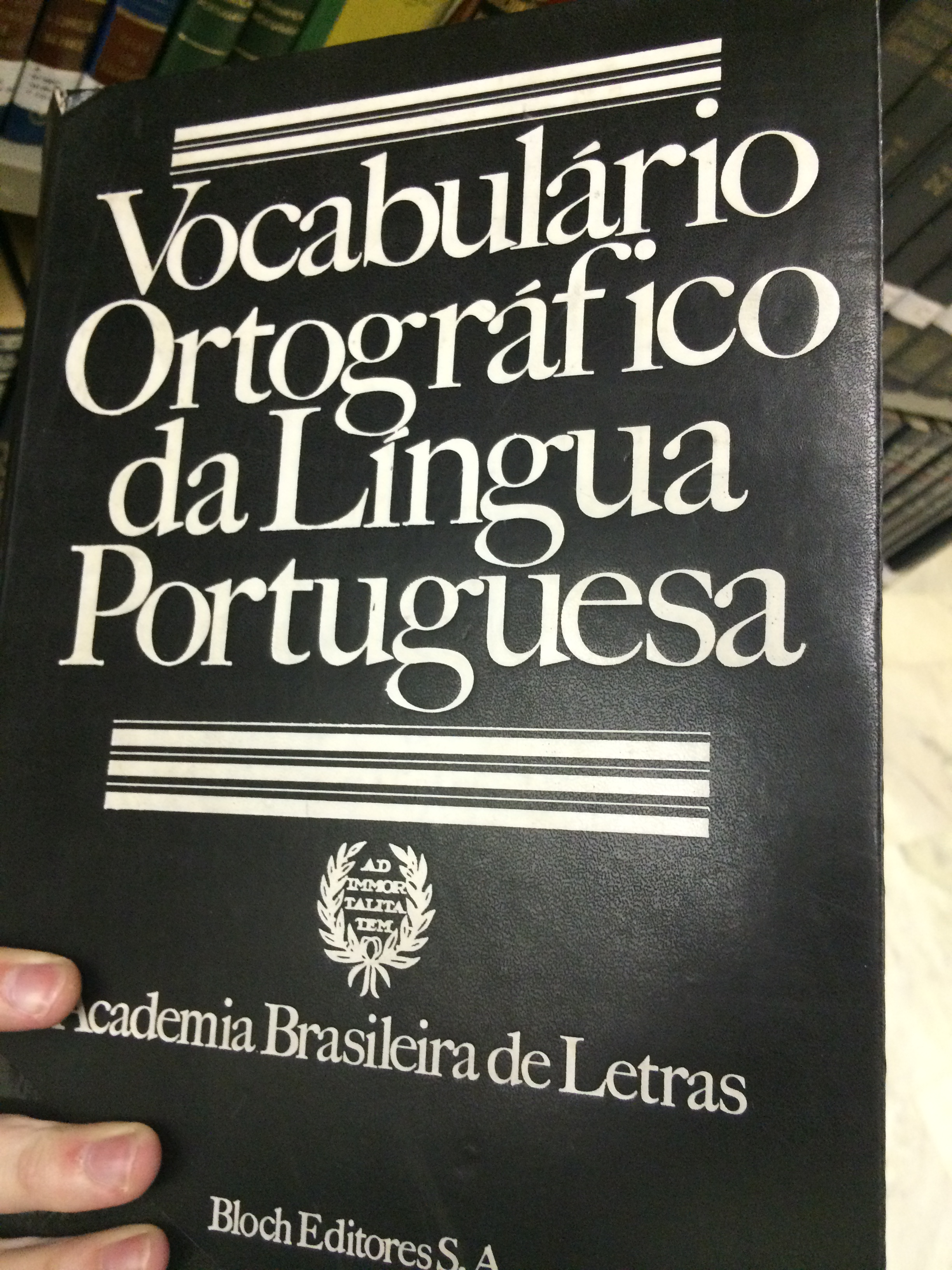
Orthographic Vocabulary of the Portuguese Language of the Brazilian Academy of Letters.

According to some contemporary Brazilian linguists (Bortoni, Kato, Mattos e Silva, Perini, and most recently, with great impact, Bagno), Brazilian Portuguese may be a highly diglossic language. This theory claims that there is an L-variant (termed "Brazilian Vernacular"), which would be the mother tongue of most Brazilians, and an H-variant (standard Brazilian Portuguese) acquired through schooling.

L-variant represents a simplified form of the language (in terms of grammar, but not of phonetics) that could have evolved from 16th-century Portuguese, influenced by Amerindian (mostly Tupi) and African languages, while H-variant would be based on 19th-century European Portuguese (and very similar to Standard European Portuguese, with only minor differences in spelling and grammar usage).

Mário A. Perini, a Brazilian linguist, even compares the depth of the differences between L- and H- variants of Brazilian Portuguese with those between Standard Spanish and European Portuguese. However, his proposal is not widely accepted by either grammarians or academics. Milton M. Azevedo wrote a chapter on diglossia in his monograph: Portuguese language (A linguistic introduction), published by Cambridge University Press in 2005.

=== Usage ===
From this point of view, the L-variant is the spoken form of Brazilian Portuguese, which should be avoided only in very formal speech (court interrogation, political debate) while the H-variant is the written form of Brazilian Portuguese, avoided only in informal writing (such as song lyrics, love letters, intimate friends correspondence). Even teachers who teach Portuguese as a subject frequently use the L-variant while explaining to students the structure and usage of the H-variant; in essays, nevertheless, all students are expected to use H-variant.

The L-variant may be used in songs, movies, soap operas, sitcoms and other television shows, although, at times, the H-variant is used in historic films or soap operas to make the language used sound more 'elegant' or 'archaic'. The H-variant used to be preferred when dubbing foreign films and series into Brazilian Portuguese, but nowadays the L-variant is preferred, although this seems to lack evidence. Movie subtitles normally use a mixture of L- and H-variants, but remain closer to the H-variant.

Most literary works are written in the H-variant. There would have been attempts at writing in the L-variant (such as the masterpiece Macunaíma by Brazilian modernist Mário de Andrade and Grande Sertão: Veredas by João Guimarães Rosa), but, presently, the L-variant is claimed to be used only in dialogue. Still, many contemporary writers like using the H-variant even in informal dialogue. This is also true of translated books, which never use the L-variant, only the H one. Children's books seem to be more L-friendly, but, again, if they are translated from another language (The Little Prince, for instance) they will use the H-variant only.

=== Prestige ===
This theory also posits that the matter of diglossia in Brazil is further complicated by forces of political and cultural bias, though those are not clearly named. Language is sometimes a tool of social exclusion or social choice.

Mário A. Perini, a Brazilian linguist, has said:

"There are two languages in Brazil. The one we write (and which is called "Portuguese"), and another one that we speak (which is so despised that there is not a name to call it). The latter is the mother tongue of Brazilians, the former has to be learned in school, and a majority of population does not manage to master it appropriately.... Personally, I do not object to us writing Portuguese, but I think it is important to make clear that Portuguese is (at least in Brazil) only a written language. Our mother tongue is not Portuguese, but Brazilian Vernacular. This is not a slogan, nor a political statement, it is simply recognition of a fact.... There are linguistic teams working hard in order to give the full description of the structure of the Vernacular. So, there are hopes, that within some years, we will have appropriate grammars of our mother tongue, the language that has been ignored, denied and despised for such a long time."

According to Milton M. Azevedo (Brazilian linguist):

"The relationship between Vernacular Brazilian Portuguese and the formal prescriptive variety fulfills the basic conditions of Ferguson's definition [of diglossia]...[...] Considering the difficulty encountered by vernacular speakers to acquire the standard, an understanding of those relationships appears to have broad educational significance. The teaching of Portuguese has traditionally meant imparting a prescriptive formal standard based on a literary register (Cunha 1985: 24) that is often at variance with the language with which students are familiar. As in a diglossic situation, vernacular speakers must learn to read and write in a dialect they neither speak nor fully understand, a circumstance that may have a bearing on the high dropout rate in elementary schools..."

According to Bagno (1999), the two variants coexist and intermingle quite seamlessly, but their status is not clear-cut. Brazilian Vernacular is still frowned upon by most grammarians and language teachers. Some of this minority, of which Bagno is an example, appeal to their readers by their ideas that grammarians would be detractors of the termed Brazilian Vernacular, by naming it a "corrupt" form of the "pure" standard, an attitude which they classify as "linguistic prejudice". Their arguments include the postulate that the Vernacular form simplifies some of the intricacies of standard Portuguese (verbal conjugation, pronoun handling, plural forms, etc.).

Bagno denounces the prejudice against the vernacular in what he terms the "8 Myths":

1. There is a striking uniformity in Brazilian Portuguese
2. A large number of Brazilians speak Portuguese poorly while in Portugal people speak it very well
3. Portuguese is difficult to learn and speak
4. People that have had poor education can't speak anything correctly
5. In the state of Maranhão people speak a better Portuguese than elsewhere in Brazil
6. We should speak as closely as possible to the written language
7. The knowledge of grammar is essential to the correct and proper use of a language
8. To master Standard Portuguese is the path to social promotion

In opposition to the "myths", Bagno counters that:

1. The uniformity of Brazilian Portuguese is just about what linguistics would predict for such a large country whose population has not, generally, been literate for centuries and which has experienced considerable foreign influence, that is, this uniformity is more apparent than real.
2. Brazilians speak Standard Portuguese poorly because they speak a language that is sufficiently different from Standard Portuguese so that the latter sounds almost "foreign" to them. In terms of comparison, it is easier for many Brazilians to understand someone from a Spanish-speaking South American country than someone from Portugal because the spoken varieties of Portuguese on either side of the Atlantic have diverged to the point of nearly being mutually unintelligible.
3. No language is difficult for those who speak it. Difficulty appears when two conditions are met: the standard language diverges from the vernacular and a speaker of the vernacular tries to learn the standard version. This divergence is the precise reason why spelling and grammar reforms happen every now and then.
4. People with less education can speak the vernacular or often several varieties of the vernacular, and they speak it well. They might, however, have trouble in speaking Standard Portuguese, but this is due to lack of experience rather than to any inherent deficiency in their linguistic mastery.
5. The people of Maranhão are not generally better than fellow Brazilians from other states in speaking Standard Portuguese, especially because that state is one of the poorest and has one of the lowest literacy rates.
6. It is the written language that must reflect the spoken and not vice versa: it is not the tail that wags the dog.
7. The knowledge of grammar is intuitive for those who speak their native languages. Problems arise when they begin to study the grammar of a foreign language.
8. Rich and influential people themselves often do not follow the grammatical rules of Standard Portuguese. Standard Portuguese is mostly a jewel or shibboleth for powerless middle-class careers (journalists, teachers, writers, actors, etc.).

Whether Bagno's points are valid or not is open to debate, especially the solutions he recommends for the problems he claims to have identified. Whereas some agree that he has captured the feelings of the Brazilians towards Brazil's linguistic situation well, his book (Linguistic Prejudice: What it Is, How it is done) has been heavily criticized by some linguists and grammarians, due to his unorthodox claims, sometimes asserted to be biased or unproven.

== Impact ==
The cultural influence of Brazilian Portuguese in the rest of the Portuguese-speaking world has greatly increased in the last decades of the 20th century, due to the popularity of Brazilian music and Brazilian soap operas. Since Brazil joined Mercosul, the South American free trade zone, Portuguese has been increasingly studied as a foreign language in Spanish-speaking partner countries.

Many words of Brazilian origin (also used in other Portuguese-speaking countries) have also entered into English: samba, bossa nova, cruzeiro, milreis and capoeira. While originally Angolan, the word "samba" only became famous worldwide because of its popularity in Brazil.

After independence in 1822, Brazilian idioms with African and Amerindian influences were brought to Portugal by returning Portuguese Brazilians (luso-brasileiros in Portuguese).

== Language codes ==
pt is a language code for Portuguese, defined by ISO standards (see ISO 639-1 and ISO 3166-1 alpha-2).

There is no ISO code for spoken or written Brazilian Portuguese.

bzs is a language code for the Brazilian Sign Language, defined by ISO standards (see ISO 639-3).

pt-BR is a language code for the Brazilian Portuguese, defined by Internet standards (see IETF language tag).

== See also ==
- Languages of Brazil
- Portuguese language
- Portuguese Language Orthographic Agreement of 1990
- Academia Brasileira de Letras
- CELPE-Bras
- Gaucho
- List of English words of Portuguese origin
- (in Portuguese) List of word differences, on the Portuguese Wiktionary
- Portuguese grammar
- Brazilian Portuguese phrasebook travel guide from Wikivoyage
- Uruguayan Portuguese

== Bibliography ==
- Andrade, Carlos Drummond de (1973), "Confissão", As impurezas do branco, Rio de Janeiro: Olympio
- Azevedo, Milton (1989), "Vernacular Features in Educated Speech in Brazilian Portuguese", Hispania, 72 (4): 862–872, doi:10.2307/343564, JSTOR 343564, archived from the original on 12 February 2006
- Azevedo, Milton (2005), Portuguese: A Linguistic Introduction, Cambridge: Cambridge University Press
- Bagno, Marcos (2001), "Português do Brasil: Herança colonial e diglossia" (PDF), Revista da FAEEBA, 15: 37–47
- Bagno, Marcos (2004), Português ou brasileiro? Um convite à pesquisa, São Paulo: Parábola
- Barbosa, Plínio A.; Albano, Eleonora C. (December 2004). "Brazilian Portuguese". Journal of the International Phonetic Association. 34 (2): 227–232. doi:10.1017/S0025100304001756. S2CID 201046105.
- Bisol, Leda (2005). Introdução a estudos de fonologia do português brasileiro (in Brazilian Portuguese). EDIPUCRS. ISBN 978-85-7430-529-5.
- Bortoni-Ricardo, Stella Maris (2005), Nós cheguemu na escola, e agora? Sociolinguística na sala de aula, São Paulo: Parábola
- Chilcote, Ronald H. (1967), Portuguese Africa, Englewood Cliffs, N.J.: Prentice-Hall
- Cook, Manuela (2013). "Portuguese Pronouns and Other Forms of Address, from the Past into the Future— Structural, Semantic and Pragmatic Reflections". Ellipsis. 11. doi:10.21471/jls.v11i0.84.
- Cunha, Antônio Sérgio Cavalcante da (2010), "Estrutura tópico-comentário, a tradição gramatical e o ensino de redação" (PDF), Soletras, 10: 53–63, archived from the original (PDF) on 12 January 2015
- Cruz-Ferreira, Madalena (December 1995). "European Portuguese". Journal of the International Phonetic Association. 25 (2): 90–94. doi:10.1017/S0025100300005223. S2CID 249414876.
- Franceschini, Lucelene (2011), "O uso dos pronomes pessoais tu/você em Concórdia – SC" (PDF), Anais do VII Congresso Internacional da Abralin, Curitiba, archived from the original (PDF) on 3 September 2011
- Hernandes, Paulo (2000), Você sabia?, Online, archived from the original on 28 February 2009
- Holm, John A. (1989), Pidgins and Creoles: Volume II: Reference Survey, Cambridge University Press, ISBN 9780521359405
- IBGE, Instituto Brasileiro de Geografia e Estatística (2011), Censo Demográfico 2010, Online
- Kato, Mary (1993), Português brasileiro – uma viagem diacrônica, Campinas: Editora da UNICAMP
- Lee, M. Kittiya (2005), Conversing in Colony: The Brasílica and the Vulgar in Portuguese America, 1500–1759 (Ph.D. Dissertation) (PDF), Baltimore: Johns Hopkins University
- Mateus, Maria Helena Mira; Rodrigues, Celeste (2003), A vibrante em coda no Português Europeu (PDF), Instituto de Linguística Teórica e Computacional (online), archived from the original (PDF) on 19 December 2008
- Módolo, Marcelo (2001), "As duas línguas do Brasil: Qual é mesmo a língua que falamos?", in Pallamin, Vera; Furtado, Joaci Pereira (eds.), Conversas no Ateliê: Palestras sobre artes e humanidades, São Paulo: FAU-USP, pp. 51–69
- Mota, Maria Alice (2008), A variação dos pronomes "tu" e "você" no português oral de São João da Ponte (MG) (Ph.D. Dissertation), Belo Horizonte: Universidade Federal de Minas Gerais
- Naro, Anthony Julius; Scherre, Maria Marta Pereira (2007), Origens do português brasileiro, São Paulo: Parábola
- Orsini, Mônica Tavares (2004), As construções de tópico no português do Brasil: Uma análise sintático-discursiva em tempo real, Rio de Janeiro: Círculo Fluminense de Estudos Filológicos e Lingüísticos, online
- Perini, Mário (2002), Modern Portuguese: A Reference Grammar, New Haven: Yale University Press
- Pontes, Eunice (1987), O tópico no português do Brasil, Campinas, SP: Pontes Editores
- Portuguese (Português), Omniglot (online), n.d.
- Prista, Alexander da (1979), Say It in Portuguese (European Usage), New York: Dover, ISBN 9780486148069
- dos Santos, Viviane Maia (2010), "A constituição de corpora orais para a análise das formas de tratamento" (PDF), Anais do IX Encontro do CELSUL, Palhoça, SC, archived from the original (PDF) on 4 March 2016
- Silva, e Mattos, Rosa Virgínia (2004), O português do Brasil são dois, São Paulo: Parábola
- Vasco, Sérgio Leitão (2003), Construções de tópico no português brasileiro: Fala popular, Rio de Janeiro: Círculo Fluminense de Estudos Filológicos e Lingüísticos, online
