= Fluminense Portuguese =

Dialect of Portuguese

- Dialeto Fluminense
- Pronunciation: d͡ʒjɐˈlɛtu flumiˈnẽsi
- Native to: Brazil
- Region: Rio de Janeiro, Minas Gerais and Espírito Santo
- Ethnicity: Flumineses
- Native speakers: c. 9 million (2022)
- Language family: Indo-European: Italic; Latin; Romance; Western; Ibero-Romance; West Iberian; Galician-Portuguese; Portuguese; Vernacular Brazilian; Fluminense Portuguese

Language codes
- ISO 639-3: –
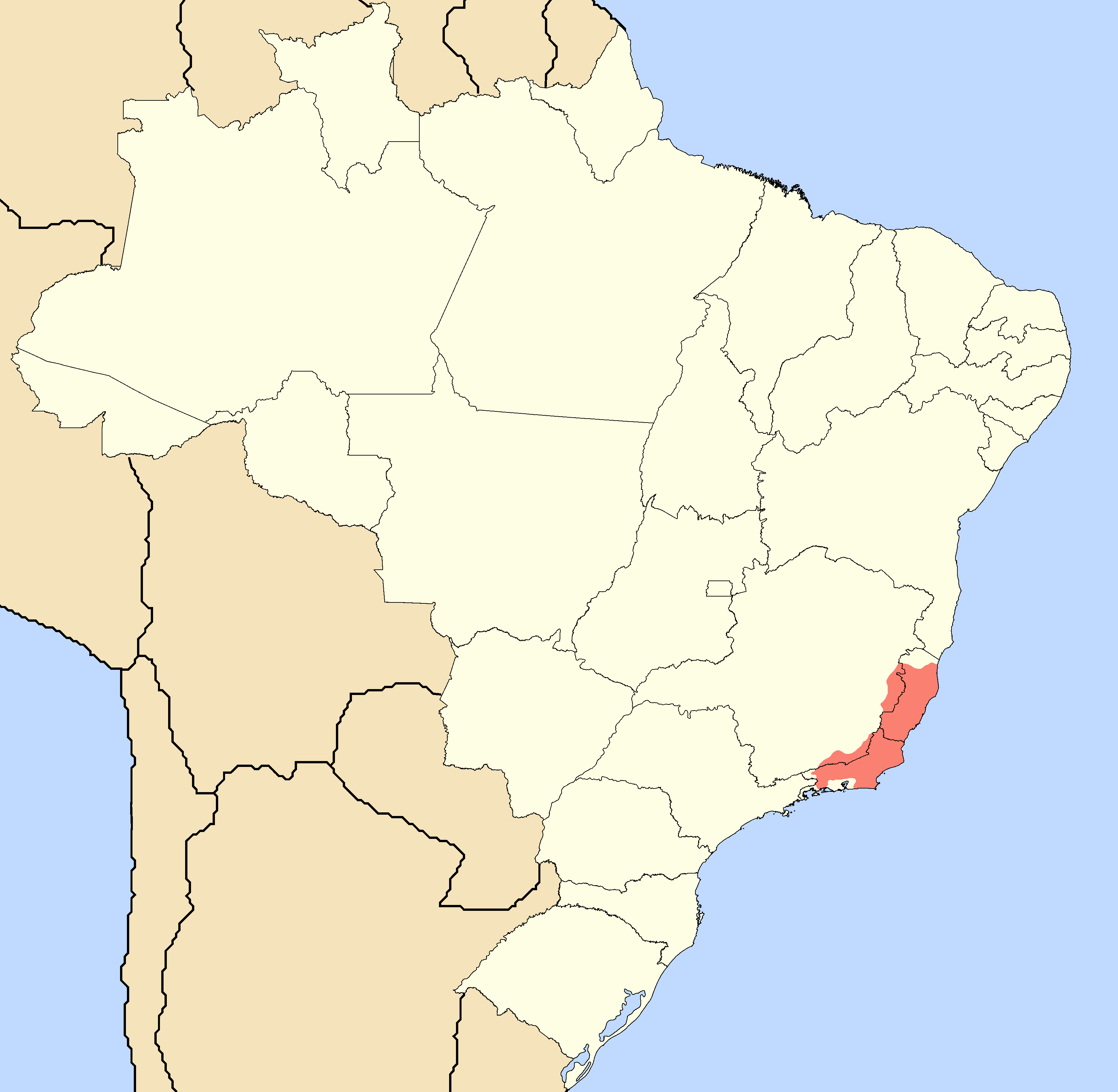
- Approximate range of the dialect over a map of Brazil.

Fluminense, also known as Flu-Capixaba, is a dialect of Portuguese spoken in most of the Brazilian states of Rio de Janeiro and Espírito Santo, as well as parts of southeastern Minas Gerais. It is considered to be one of the closest Brazilian Portuguese dialects to the variations of the language spoken in Portugal.

The dialect is notorious for the presence of vowel reduction of /e/ and /o/ into /i/ and /u/, stress timing, the palatalization of /s/ and /z/ in the end of syllables into /ʒ/ or /ʃ/ and the abundance of diphthongs and palatal fricative phonemes, which differentiates it from the Carioca dialect, the closest variation of Portuguese to Fluminense. Fluminense speakers tend to substitute the /ɾ/ sound in the end of words for /ʁ/.
