= Mário A. Perini =

Brazilian linguist (born 1943)

- Born: 1943 (age 82–83)
- Education: Federal University of Minas Gerais, University of Texas at Austin
- Known for: works on the description of Brazilian Portuguese
- Scientific career
- Fields: Linguistics
- Workplaces: Federal University of Minas Gerais
- Thesis: A Grammar of Portuguese Infinitives (1974)
- Doctoral advisor: C. L. Baker
- Website: lattes.cnpq.br/0127519070588616

Mário Alberto Perini (born in 1943) is a Brazilian linguist known mainly for his work on the description of Brazilian Portuguese. He is professor emeritus at the Federal University of Minas Gerais; he has also taught at the University of Illinois and at the University of Mississippi. In 2021, Perini was elected Honorary Member of the Brazilian Linguistics Association.

== Selected works ==
- Gramática do Infinitivo Português (1977)
- Para uma nova gramática do português (1985)
- Sintaxe portuguesa: metodologia e funções (1989)
- Gramática descritiva do português (1995)
- Sofrendo a gramática: ensaios sobre a linguagem (1997)
- Modern Portuguese: A reference grammar (2002)
- A língua do Brasil amanhã e outros mistérios (2004)
- Princípios de linguística descritiva: introdução ao pensamento gramatical (2006)
- Estudos de gramática descritiva: as valências verbais (2008)
- Gramática do português brasileiro (2010)
- Describing verb valency: practical and theoretical issues (2015)
- Gramática descritiva do português brasileiro (2016)
- Thematic Relations: A Study in the Grammar-Cognition Interface (2019)
- Function and Class in Linguistic Description: The Taxonomic Foundations of Grammar (2021)
