= Sulista dialect =

Dialect of Portuguese spoken in Brazil

Sulista Portuguese
- Dialeto Sulista
- Pronunciation: /d͡ʒi.aˈlɛ.tu suˈlis.tɐ/
- Native to: Brazil
- Region: Southern Brazil
- Ethnicity: Colonos
- Language family: Indo-European: Italic; Latin; Romance; Western; Ibero-Romance; West Iberian; Galician-Portuguese; Portuguese; Vernacular Brazilian; Sulista Portuguese

Language codes
- ISO 639-3: None (mis)
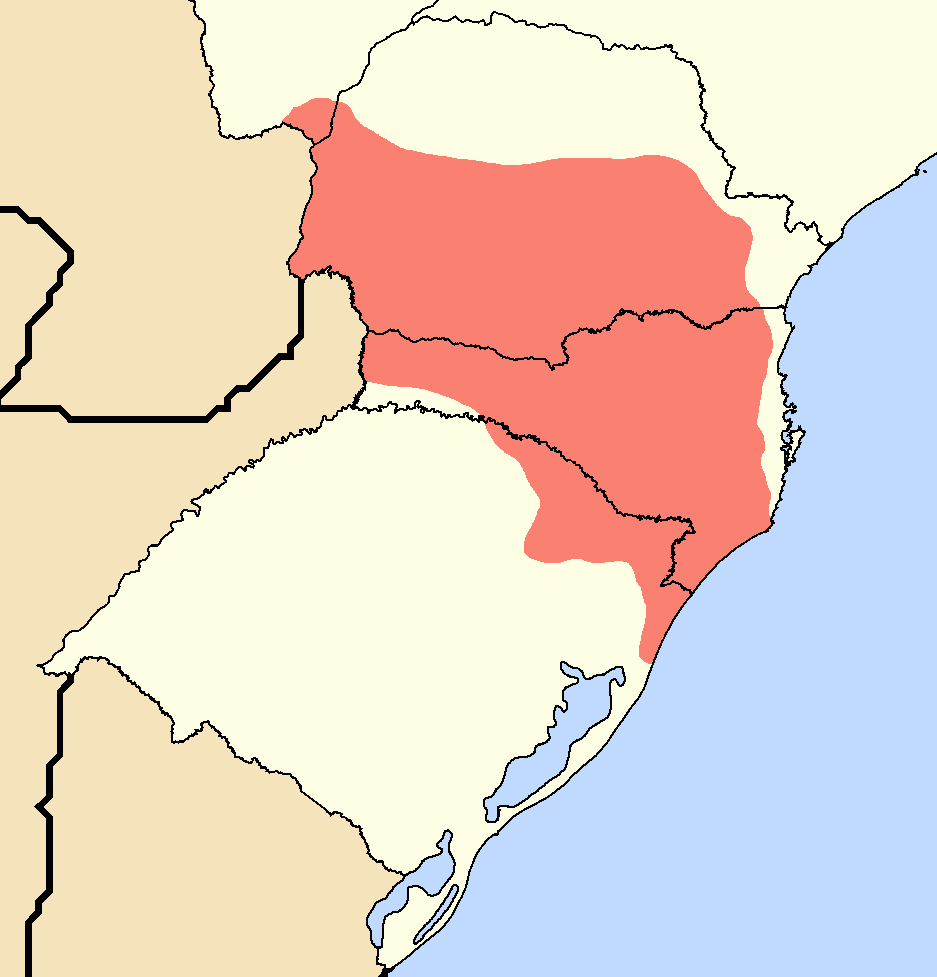
- Approximate range of the dialect over a map of southern Brazil.

Sulista Portuguese, also known as Southern Brazilian Portuguese, is a dialect of the Portuguese language spoken in most of the Southern Brazilian states of Paraná and Santa Catarina, as well as parts of northern Rio Grande do Sul. It was first described by Brazilian linguist Antenor Nacentes in 1953.

== Characteristics ==
The Sulista dialect is characterized by the shortening of vowels and the presence of vowel harmonization when mid vowels come in pretonic positions. Some authors claim the dialect also has a greater variation between mid open and mid closed vowels.

Other characteristics include:

- Pronunciation of nasal consonants when they come in the end of syllables (with exception of syllables that end with a toneless "am", which is sometimes pronounced as "ão", /ɐ̃w/);
- Pronunciation of "e" in the end of words as /e/, as opposed to the rest of the Brazilian dialects, in which it is pronounced as /i/. e.g.: quente is pronounced as /ʹkente/ instead of /ʹkẽti/, /ʹkẽʧ/ or /ʹkẽjʧ/), leading to the stereotypical use of the phrase leite quente ("hot milk") as a stereotype for this accent (especially in relation to the largest city in the core area, Curitiba), as this phenomenon happens twice on this phrase.
- Reduction of descending diphthongs when followed by fricatives in coda. This characteristic occurs only in the Sulista variants present in eastern Santa Catarina, due to influences from the Azorean-derived Florianopolitan dialect.

== Vocabulary ==
The Sulista dialect has a distinctive regional lexicon, including terms such as vina ("sausage", salsicha in other variants of portuguese), and cancha ("sports court", quadra elsewhere).
