= Compound subject =

Two or more individual noun phrases coordinated to form a single, longer noun phrase

A compound subject consists of two or more individual noun phrases coordinated to form a single, longer noun phrase. Compound subjects cause many difficulties in compliance with grammatical agreement between the subject and other entities (verbs, pronouns, etc.). These issues also occur with compound noun phrases of all sorts, but the problems are most acute with compound subjects because of the large number of types of agreement occurring with such subjects.

For English compound subjects joined by and, the agreement rules are generally unambiguous, but sometimes tricky. For example, the compound subject you and I is treated equivalently to we, taking appropriate pronominal agreement ("our car", not "your car", "their car", etc.). In languages with more extensive subject-verb agreement (e.g. Spanish or Arabic), the verb agreement is clearly revealed as also being first-person plural.

Compound subjects joined by and generally take a plural verb. However, there are exceptions. When compound subjects are thought of as a single unit, a singular verb is used, e.g. Peanut butter and jelly is available in the cafeteria.

As shown in the examples, if the subjects are joined by or, the rules are often ill-defined, especially when two elements that differ in grammatical gender or grammatical number are coordinated. The tendency, in such cases, is to rewrite the sentences to avoid the conjunction: e.g. "Sylvia and I each have our own car, and one of us is planning to sell their car". This still has a compound subject using and as the conjunction, and uses "semi-informal" "generic their" to get around the "his or her" problem. This could be avoided with a further rewrite: "Either Sylvia will sell her car, or I will sell mine."

== Examples ==
1. Jack and Jill went up the hill.
2. Haley and I went to the park.
3. John and Jill are coming to visit.
4. John or Jill is coming to visit. (Better with "either")
5. My sisters or my mother is/are coming to visit. (Rewrite as "Either my sisters are coming to visit, or my mother is.")
6. My mother or father is coming to visit.
7. John and I are going to sell their car.
8. You and John are going to sell your (you guys', your own) car.
9. John and I are going to sell our cars. (ambiguous between whether we own two cars jointly, or each owns one car individually)
10. John or Jim is going to sell their car. (i.e. they jointly own the car, one of them will sell it)
11. John or Jim is going to sell his car. (i.e. either one of them will sell that one's own car, or one of them will sell someone else car: if the "someone else" has just been mentioned.)
12. John and I are going to sell our car. (i.e. we jointly own the car, together we'll sell it)
13. John and I are going to sell his? own car. (i.e. one of us will sell the car he owns, assuming that I am male)
14. Sylvia or I are/am/is? going to sell our car. (i.e. we jointly own the car, one of us will sell it. Remove the difficulty by changing the auxiliary verb to just "will".)
15. Sylvia or I are/am/is? going to sell their(??) own car. (i.e. one of us will sell the car he or she owns, assuming that I am male and Sylvia is female)

== General concerns ==
Additional concerns appear in compound subjects in languages other than English. In many European languages, for example, a standard problem occurs with mixed-gender compound subjects. This problem does not appear in English, because they is genderless. But e.g. French has masculine ils vs. feminine elles; Spanish similarly has masculine ellos vs. feminine ellas. In addition, Arabic has gender as well as person and number agreement on its verbs, and more specifically in its literary language and in the more conservative spoken varieties, there is gender agreement with third-person plural subjects.

In addition, some languages allow subjects to follow verbs: either optionally for stylistic reasons, as in German, Latin or occasionally in English ("Now are entering John, Jim, and their wives"); as the normal state of affairs, as in Classical Arabic and Irish, where subjects precede the verb only for stylistic reasons; or even as a mandatory requirement, in languages with V-S-O or V-O-S word order and a strongly fixed word order. These languages often use different strategies for handling subjects after vs. before the verb: for example, tending to prefer an "agree with the closest phrase" strategy with a following subject, for pragmatic reasons, even when an "agree with the whole" strategy is used in other circumstances.

Multiple strategies have been used to handle both compound subjects in general and category disagreement between/among the coordinate members of the subject. Languages often differ in which strategies they use. Among the strategies are:

- General agreement: Consider the total set of entities involved, work out their properties, and assign a pronoun accordingly. (E.g. if the set of entities includes two women referred to in the third person, and the language has grammatical dual, as in Arabic, then the group's properties would be "dual number, female, third person", with corresponding pronoun humatā.)
- Closest agreement: Simply agree with the constituent noun phrase that is closest to the verb, and ignore the rest. This generally applies only to subject-verb agreement; pronominal agreement is by its nature long-distance, and so the concept of "closest" makes less sense in this case.
- If using "general agreement" and there is a disagreement among properties (e.g. some male, some female), either:
  - Choose one (the traditional rule for most languages has been to treat mixed groups as male; some modern rules, on the other hand, call for randomly choosing one sex or the other, alternating choosing male and female in successive similar circumstances, or even for simply choosing the female gender in all cases).
  - Use a construction (e.g. "he or she", "his or her", "our(s)") that captures both or all values of the disagreeing property. Often this is considered awkward and to be avoided.

== Additional concerns in English ==
An additional concern in English is that there are special rules for pronouns in compound subjects. Although English has morphological case distinctions in pronouns (e.g. I vs. me), grammatical case is not a living characteristic of the spoken language, and hence the case-based terms subjective case (e.g. for I) vs. objective case (e.g. for me) are misleading. In general, in the spoken language, me is the default form, but I for an argument of a verb when occurring directly before a finite verb. On the other hand, in compound subjects in informal speech, me occurs in this position, e.g. Johnny and me are coming tomorrow (possibly because of the lack of direct agreement between me and are).

Children are often taught in school as a matter of politeness that they should always order oneself after any others in a compound subject and use I, saying Johnny and I instead of I and Johnny and in a compound object use Johnny and me instead of me and Johnny. Although intended specifically for compound subjects, when adopted by speakers it typically is generalized to compound objects, leading to alternations such as between me and you vs. between you and I.

== Bibliography ==
- Everaert, M.; van Riemsdijk, H.; Goedemans, R. (eds) 2006. The Blackwell companion to syntax, Volumes I–V, Blackwell, London.
- Halliday, M.A.K & Matthiessen, Christian M. I. M (2004). Subject, actor, theme in An introduction to functional grammar. Hodder Arnold, London, England.
- Huddleston, R.; Pullum, K. (2005). A student's introduction to English grammar. Cambridge University Press.

== See also ==
- Subject (grammar)
- Object (grammar)
- Subjective (grammar)
- Grammatical case
- English pronouns
- Subject verb agreement
