= Gaúcho dialect =

Brazilian Portuguese dialect from Rio Grande do Sul

- Gaúcho / Gauchês / Guasca
- Native to: Brazil
- Region: Rio Grande do Sul
- Language family: Indo-European: Italic; Latin; Romance; Western Romance; Ibero-Romance; West-Iberian; Galician-Portuguese; Portuguese; Brazilian Portuguese; Gaúcho dialect

Language codes
- ISO 639-3: –
- IETF: pt-u-sd-brrs
- Rio Grande do Sul

Gaúcho (Portuguese pronunciation: [ɡaˈuʃu], locally [ɡaˈuʃo]), more rarely called Sulriograndense, is the Brazilian Portuguese term for the characteristic accent spoken in Rio Grande do Sul, Brazil's southernmost state, including its capital, Porto Alegre. It is heavily influenced by Spanish and somewhat influenced by Hunsrückisch, Venetian, Guarani and other native languages.

== Phonology ==
Its phonology is heavily similar to Rioplatense Spanish, including its characteristics of the speaking syllabic rhythm, use of L-vocalization in the syllable coda, and little use of nasal vowels, basically restricted to the monophthong /ɐ̃/ and the diphthongs /ɐ̃w̃, õj̃/.

In the western and some central varieties there is the absence of vowel reduction with word-final ⟨e⟩ and ⟨o⟩ (for example, leite is /ˈlejte/ instead of /ˈlejt^{(ʃ)}i/ and tudo is /ˈtu.do/ instead of /ˈtu.du/). In some other cities of the region, the nasal monophthong /ɐ̃/ is heightened to /ə̃/, and in the metropolitan region final /ɐ/ may be realised as /ə/.

The "hard" rhotic usually registers in western varieties as [r] medially and [ʁ] initially or following /l/, /s/, /n/ or /m/. In eastern varieties /ʁ/ has lenitioned into /ɦ/, /h/ or /x/ and /r/ is not found.

The "soft" rhotic tends to register as either a short trill or [ɾ]. Although finally in eastern varieties, due to influence from Paulistano, it is sometimes realised as [ɹ].

== Grammar ==
Grammatically, one of its most notable features is the use of tu, instead of você, with the verb conjugating differently: e.g. tu corre and tu lava instead of *tu corres and *tu lavas. However, use of the standard você is also not rare. The same feature also occurs in other dialects of Brazilian Portuguese.

== Vocabulary ==
| Gaúcho | Standard Brazilian Portuguese | Meaning |
|---|---|---|
| aspa | chifre | horn |
| avio | isqueiro | lighter |
| bah! | puxa!, nossa! | exclamation of surprise |
| bagual | excelente, ótimo | excellent, very good |
| bergamota | tangerina, mexerica | tangerine |
| bodoque | estilingue | slingshot |
| borracho | bêbado | drunk |
| cacetinho | pão francês | French bread |
| campear | procurar | to look for |
| chavear | trancar | to lock |
| chimia | geleia | jam |
| china | mulher | girl |
| cusco | cachorro, cão | dog |
| fatiota | terno | suit (noun) |
| inticar | provocar | to provoke |
| lancheria | lanchonete | restaurant/eating place |
| parelho | liso, homogêneo, igual | straight, equal |
| patente | vaso sanitário | toilet |
| peleia | briga | fight |
| remolacha | beterraba | beetroot |
| tchê! | cacilda!, caramba! | sentence intensifier or you (i.e. "Hey, you *name*") |
| terneiro | bezerro | calf |
| tri | legal, bacana | nice, cool |
| vivente | ser, pessoa | living being |
| a la pucha! | | praises what was heard |
| querência | pátria | fatherland, homeland |
| xis | hambúrguer | hamburger |

== Regional differences ==
The Gaúcho dialect ranges in features as the western variations have stronger influence from Rioplatense Spanish and the eastern, especially the ones spoken in the Metropolitan Region of Porto Alegre, stronger influence of the Paulistano dialect, resulting in differing features depending on the region the dialect is spoken.

== See also ==
- Gaucho
- Portuguese dialects
- Portuguese phonology
