= Portuguese dialects =

Variations of the Portuguese language

Portuguese dialects are the mutually intelligible variations of the Portuguese language in Portuguese-speaking countries and other areas holding some degree of cultural bond with the language. Portuguese has two standard forms of writing and numerous regional spoken variations, with often large phonological and lexical differences.

In Portugal, the language is regulated by the Sciences Academy of Lisbon, Class of Letters and its national dialect is called European Portuguese. This written variation is the one preferred by Portuguese ex-colonies in Africa and Asia, including Cabo Verde, Mozambique, Angola, Timor-Leste, Macau and Goa. The form of Portuguese used in Brazil is regulated by the Brazilian Academy of Letters and is known as Brazilian Portuguese.

Differences between European and Brazilian written forms of Portuguese occur in a similar way, and are often compared to, those of British English and American, though spelling divergencies were generally believed to occur with a little greater frequency in the two Portuguese written dialects until a new standard orthography came into full effect in the 2010s. Differences in syntax and word construction, not directly related to spelling, are also observed. Furthermore, there were attempts to unify the two written variations, the most recent of them being the Orthographic Agreement of 1990, which only began to take effect in the 2000s and is still under implementation in some countries. This and previous reforms faced criticism by people who say they are unnecessary or inefficient or even that they create more differences instead of reducing or eliminating them.

The differences between the various spoken Portuguese dialects are mostly in phonology, in the frequency of usage of certain grammatical forms, and especially in the distance between the formal and informal levels of speech. Lexical differences are numerous but largely confined to "peripheral" words, such as plants, animals, and other local items, with little impact in the core lexicon.

Dialectal deviations from the official grammar are relatively few. As a consequence, all Portuguese dialects are mutually intelligible although for some of the most extremely divergent pairs, the phonological changes may make it difficult for speakers to understand rapid speech.

== Main subdivisions ==
=== Europe ===
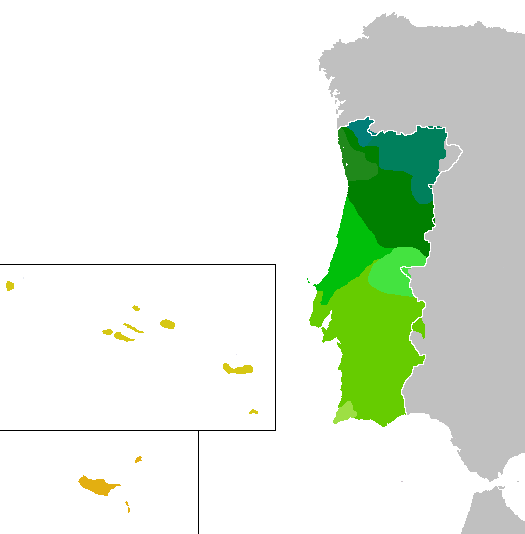
European Portuguese dialects: 1. Dark green: North; 2. Light green: South; 3. Yellow: Azorean; 4. Orange: Madeirense

The dialects of Portugal can be divided into two major groups:

- The southern and central dialects are broadly characterized by preserving the distinction between /b/ and /v/, and by the tendency to monophthongize ei and ou to [e̞] and [o̞]. They include the dialect of the capital, Lisbon, but it has some peculiarities of its own. Although the dialects of the Atlantic archipelagos of the Azores and Madeira have unique characteristics, as well, they can also be grouped with the southern dialects.
- The northern dialects are characterized by preserving the pronunciation of ei and ou as diphthongs [ei̯], [ou̯], and by somewhat having sometimes merged /v/ with /b/ (like in Spanish). They include the dialect of Porto, Portugal's second largest city.

Within each of these regions, however, is further variation, especially in pronunciation. For example, in Lisbon and its vicinity, the diphthong ei is centralized to [ɐi̯] instead of being monophthongized, as in the south.

It is usually believed that the dialects of Brazil, Africa, and Asia are derived mostly from those of central and southern Portugal.

==== Barranquenho ====
In the Portuguese town of Barrancos (on the border between Extremadura, Andalucia and Portugal), a dialect of Portuguese heavily influenced by Southern Spanish dialects, known as barranquenho is spoken by a small community of 1500 people.

=== South America ===
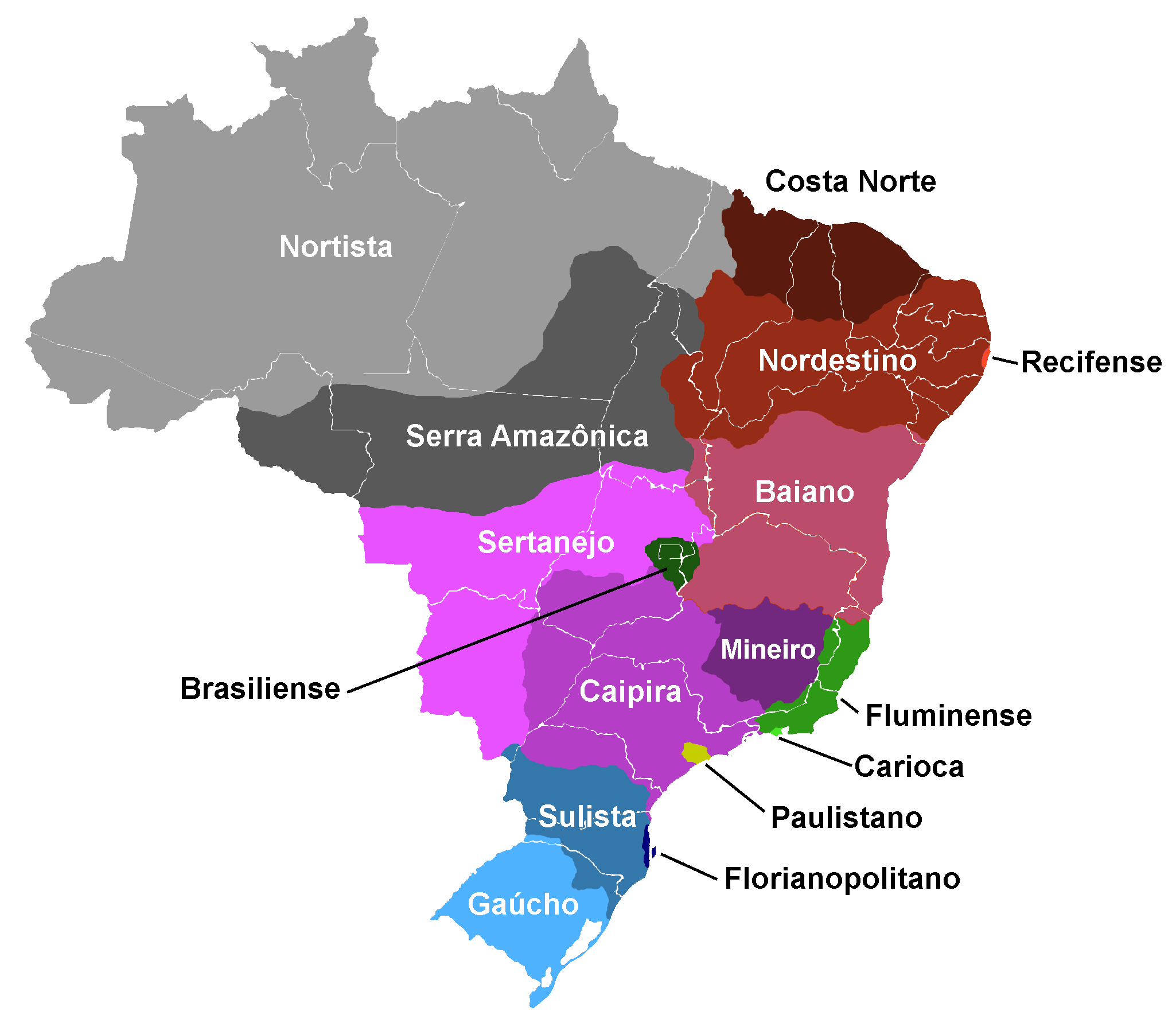
Some of the documented dialects within Brazil Amazon: · Nortista (Northern) · Serra Amazônica (Highland) Nordeste (Northeast): · Nordestino · Costa Norte (North Coast) · Recifense (Recife) · Baiano Central: · Sertanejo · Brasiliense (Brasília) · Mineiro · Caipira Carioca: · Fluminense · Carioca (Rio de Janeiro) Southern: · Sulista (Southern) · Gaúcho · Florianopolitan (Florianópolis) Paulista: · Paulistano (São Paulo)

Brazilian dialects can be divided into northern and southern groups, the northern dialects tending to slightly more open pre-stressed vowels. The dialects of São Paulo and Rio de Janeiro have had some influence on the rest of the country in Brazil during the occupation of the territory, and through economic influence in the country (alongside neighbor states like Minas Gerais). However, migration from the Northern states to the Southern states points to the two-way nature of the phenomenon. Local culture also plays important roles in the dialect-region sinergy throughout time. Speakers of what is for times called the Gaúcho accent (which carries traits from several languages), have been found to hold the accent as representative at remarkable level compared to other dialects. Also, considerable groups of people in inland cities of the three southern states carry noticeable German accent in their speech, which also applies to languages like Italian or Polish. Phenomena like internal migration, government policy, external pressure and socio-economic dynamics are some drivers that allow for proper understanding of the overwhelmingly complex development of the language, and the country, up to, and arguably most importantly for the current state of things, the 20th century. A convoluted process that was somehow encoded through, and into the language, not always in writing. Between Brazilian Portuguese, particularly in its most informal varieties, and European Portuguese, there can be noticeable differences in grammar, aside from the differences in pronunciation and vocabulary. The most prominent ones concern the placement of clitic pronouns, and the use of subject pronouns as objects in the third person. Non-standard inflections are also common in colloquial Brazilian Portuguese.

=== Africa, Asia and Oceania ===
For historical reasons, the dialects of Africa are generally closer to those of Portugal than the Brazilian dialects, but in some aspects of their phonology, especially the pronunciation of unstressed vowels, they resemble Brazilian Portuguese more than European Portuguese. They have not been studied as exhaustively as European and Brazilian Portuguese.

Asian Portuguese dialects are similar to the African ones and so are generally close to those of Portugal. In Macau, the syllable onset rhotic /ʁ/ is pronounced as a voiced uvular fricative [ʁ] or an uvular trill [ʀ].

== Notable features of some dialects ==
Many dialects have special characteristics. Most of the differences are seen in phonetics and phonology, and here are some of the more prominent:

=== Conservative ===
- In some regions of northern Portugal and Brazil, the digraph ou still denotes a falling diphthong [ou̯], but it has been monophthongized to [o] by most speakers of Portuguese.
- In the dialects of Alto-Minho and Trás-os-Montes (northern Portugal), the digraph ch still denotes the affricate /tʃ/, as in Galicia, but for most speakers, it has merged with /ʃ/.
- Some dialects of northern Portugal still contrast the predorsodental sibilants c/ç /s/ and z /z/ with apicoalveolar sibilants s(s) /s̺/ and s /z̺/, with minimal pairs such as passo /ˈpas̺u/ "step" and paço /ˈpasu/ "palace" or coser /kuˈz̺eɾ/ "to sew" and cozer /kuˈzeɾ/ "to cook", which are homophones in most dialects. The other dialects of northern Portugal that have lost this distinction have apicoalveolar sibilants instead of the predorsodental fricatives, found in all southern dialects of Portugal as well as in Brazil. In those dialects, they also appear in syllable codas instead of the [ʃ] realizations that can be observed in all southern dialects.
- In northern Portugal, the pronoun vós and its associated verb forms are still in use.
- In Alentejo and parts of the Algarve (southern Portugal), one finds word-final [i] where standard EP has [ɨ], a feature shared with BP.
- Also in Brazil, Alentejo and the Algarve, progressive constructions are formed with the gerund form of verbs instead of a followed by the infinitive that one finds in most dialects of Portugal: está chovendo vs. está a chover ("it's raining").

=== Innovative ===
- In central and southern Portugal (except the city of Lisbon and its vicinity), the diphthong /ei̯/ is monophthongized to [e]. The nasal diphthong /ẽi̯/ is often monophthongized to [ẽ] as well.
- In and near Lisbon, /ei̯/ and /ẽi̯/ are pronounced [ɐi̯] and [ɐ̃i̯], respectively. Furthermore, stressed /e/ is pronounced [ɐ] or [ɐi̯] before a palato-alveolar or a palatal consonant followed by another vowel.
- In the dialect of the Beiras (Beira Interior Norte, Cova da Beira and Beira Interior Sul) in central Portugal, the sibilant /ʒ/ occurs at the end of words, before another word which starts with a vowel, instead of /z/.
- In northern Portugal, the phoneme /m/ has a velar allophone [ŋ] at the end of words.
- In the dialects of Beira Baixa (Southern Inland Beiras, Beira Interior Sul) (Castelo Branco), Northern Portalegre and Far Western Algarve (Barlavento area) and São Miguel Island in the Azores (aka Micaelense), the near-front rounded vowel [ʏ] replaces /u/, in a process similar to the one that originated the French u. (There is also front rounded vowel [ø] in Beira Baixa, Northern Portalegre and São Miguel Island dialects but not in Far Western Algarve dialect or Madeira island). These are the only Galician-Portuguese and Ibero-Romance (or Hispano-Romance) dialects to have these phonemes and they are in common with Gallo-Romance ones, which differentiate them from all the other Galician-Portuguese and Ibero-Romance dialects.(see note at the end of the article)
- Micaelense Portuguese also features other sounds in its vowel inventory that is unique to all Portuguese dialects (like the nasal [ʏ]). The Micaelense vowel front rounded vowel [ø] replaces the Standard European Portuguese close-mid back rounded vowel [o] in words spelt with ou/oi, as in outra or boi. Although all Azorean dialects are usually grouped together as a whole (for the sake of geographical grouping), these two characteristics are emblematic mostly of Micaelense Portuguese only, and is not the case in the way speakers of Azorean dialects from the other eight islands speak. However both [ʏ] and [ø] phonemes are also present in the some parts (locolects) of other islands, in Terceira, Graciosa, Eastern Pico, Flores and Corvo, but are totally absent in the islands of Santa Maria (although close and south of São Miguel, Santa Maria island dialect is very different from São Miguel), Faial, São Jorge and Western Pico. (see note at the end of the article)
- In northern Portugal, the close vowels /o/ and /e/ may be pronounced as diphthongs, such as in "Porto", pronounced [ˈpwoɾtu], "quê": [kje], "hoje": [ˈwoʒɨ] or even [ˈwoi̯ʒɨ]
- Some dialects of southern Portugal have gerund forms that inflect for person and number: em chegandos (when you arrive), em chegândemos (when we arrive), em chegandem (when you/they arrive). They are not used in writing.
- There are some dialectal differences in how word final [u] is realized. In Brazilian Portuguese, it is always pronounced. In Portugal, it is usually most audible when at the end of an utterance. In other contexts, it may be realized not at all or as mere labialization of the preceding consonant. The northern dialects tend to maintain it in most contexts. For instance, a sentence like o meu irmão comprou um carro novo ("my brother bought a new car") would be pronounced as [u ˈmew iɾˈmɐ̃w̃ kõˈpɾow ũ ˈkaʁu ˈnovu] or [u ˈmew iɾˈmɐ̃w̃ kõˈpɾow ũ ˈkaʁʷ ˈnovu] in those dialects. In the Lisbon dialect the last two words would instead be pronounced [ˈkaʁʷ ˈnovu], [ˈkaʁʷ ˈnovʷ], [ˈkaʁ ˈnovu] or [ˈkaʁ ˈnovʷ]. In southern Portugal, word final [w] and [w̃] are also affected so in Alentejo, the same sentence would sound [u ˈme iɾˈmɐ̃ kõˈpɾo ũ ˈkaʁ ˈnovu] (in that dialect, utterance final vowels are also noticeably very prolonged so a more accurate transcription might be [ˈnovuː] for this example). In the southernmost region of the country, the Algarve, the vowel is completely lost: [u ˈme iɾˈmɐ̃ kõˈpɾo ũ ˈkaʁ ˈnov].
- In most of Brazil, syllable-final /l/ is vocalized to /w/, which causes mau "bad" and mal "badly" to become homophones (although Brazilians tends to use ruim in place of mau). Similarly, degrau "step" and jornal "journal" rhyme, which results in false plurals such as degrais "steps" (vs. correct degraus), by analogy with correct plural jornais. In the caipira dialect, and in parts of Goiás and Minas Gerais, syllable-final /l/ is instead merged with /ɾ/, pronounced as an alveolar approximant [ɹ] in the Caipira way.
- The pronunciation of syllable-initial and syllable-final r varies considerably with dialect. See Guttural R in Portuguese, for details. Syllable-initial ⟨r⟩ and doubled ⟨rr⟩ are pronounced as a guttural [ʁ] in most cities in Portugal, but as a traditional trill [r] in rural Portugal. In Brazil, the sound is normally pronounced as an unvoiced guttural ([x], [χ] or [h]), which is also used for ⟨r⟩ at the end of syllables (except in the caipira dialect, which uses an alveolar approximant [ɹ], and the gaúcho dialect, sulista dialect and paulistano dialect which use an alveolar flap [ɾ] or trill [r]). In the northern dialects of Brazil, ⟨r⟩ at the end of words is normally silent or barely pronounced, it is kept, however, in most southern dialects, except in infinitives, where it tends to be omitted everywhere. In Macau, where Portuguese is spoken mostly as a second language, initial and intervocalic "r" is sometimes replaced with a diphthong, and ⟨r⟩ at the end of words (esp. when final-stressed) is sometimes silent.
- Some speakers of São Tomé and Príncipe produce the vibratory alveolar consonant [r] in positions that do not exist in the Portuguese spoken in Brazil and Portugal. In addition, there is still the voiced uvular fricative [ʁ] as a variant that clearly distinguishes two generations of Portuguese speakers, those under 39 years old and those over 40 years old, or those born before or after the independence of the country.
- Varieties in the Portuguese spoken in Uruguay share many similarities with the countryside dialects of the southern Brazilian state of Rio Grande do Sul, such as the denasalization of final unstressed nasal vowels, replacement of lateral palatal /ʎ/ with semivowel /j/, no raising of final unstressed /e/, alveolar trill /r/ instead of the guttural R, and lateral realization of coda /l/ instead of L-vocalization. Some of these sounds do not exist in Portugal.
- In Guinea-Bissau, "the final ‘l’ seems weaker than in Portugal, even giving the impression of that there is a minimal pause between the preceding vowel and it, as in 'Senegal', which comes out like [seneˈga-l]". There is also height neutralization between middle vowels and, therefore, "if [Guineans] say 'he' (pronoun), we seem to hear 'he' (letter name), and vice versa".
- The close central vowel /ɨ/ occurs only at final, unstressed syllables, e.g. presidente /pɾeziˈdẽtɨ/ in Angola. Furthermore, many Angolans usually replace the consonant /ɲ/ with [j̃], for example, "ninho" [ˈnĩj̃u], nasalizing the vowel that precedes it.
- The pronunciation of syllable-final s/x/z also varies with dialect. See Portuguese phonology for details. Portugal and Rio de Janeiro favor [ʃ], both before a consonant and finally. Most other parts of Brazil favor [s], but in the Northeast, [ʃ] is often heard before consonants, especially /t/ (but not at the end of words).
- In the Northeast of Brazil and, to an increasing extent, in Rio de Janeiro and elsewhere, [j] is inserted before final /s/ in a final-stressed word, which makes mas "but" and mais "more" homonyms, both pronounced [majs] or [majʃ]. Other affected examples are faz "he does", dez "ten", nós "we", voz "voice", luz "light", Jesus "Jesus", etc. Related forms like fazem, vozes, nosso are unaffected since /s/ is no longer final.
- In Mozambique at the end of words ending in 'e' it changes to 'i' instead of 'ɨ' as in Portugal (for example [felisidádi] instead of [fɨlisidádɨ]), as well as in Brazil. Mozambicans also suppress the final /r/ phoneme (for example, estar is read [eʃ'tá] instead of [eʃ'táɾ]) and the suppression of unaccented vowels is not as strong as in Portugal.
- In Cape Verde /l/ is laminal dental [l̪], i.e., it is pronounced with the tip of the tongue touching the upper teeth. It is similar to the "l" sound in Spanish, French or German. The "l" sound in Portugal is velarized alveolar [ɫ͇], i.e., that is, it is pronounced with the tip of the tongue touching the alveoli, well behind the upper incisor teeth, with the tongue curved, with a concavity facing upwards.
- In most of Brazil, /t/, /d/ are palatalized to [tʃ], [dʒ] when they are followed by /i/. Common sources of /i/ are the unstressed ending -e, as in gente "people" [ˈʒẽtʃi] and de "of" [dʒi], and the epenthetic /i/ in words such as advogado "lawyer" [adʒivoˈɡadu]. Prefixes de-, des- and dez- (such as dezoito "eighteen") vary from word to word and from speaker to speaker between [de], [des]/[dez]/etc. and [dʒi], [dʒis]/[dʒiz]/etc..
- Informal Brazilian Portuguese makes major changes in its use of pronouns:
  - Informal tu is dropped entirely in most regions along with all second-person singular verbal inflections. When tu survives, it is used with third-person inflections.
  - Clitic te [tʃi] survives as the normal clitic object pronoun corresponding to você.
  - Clitic pronouns almost always precede the verb. Post-verbal clitics and mesoclisis are seen only in formal contexts.
  - Possessives seu, sua virtually always mean "your". To say "his, her", constructions like o carro dele "his car" or o carro dela "her car" are used.
  - Third-person clitics o, a, os, as and combined clitics like mo, no-lo are virtually never heard in speech. Instead, the clitics are simply omitted, especially to refer to objects; or a subject pronoun is placed after the verb: Eu levo "I'll get it"; Vi ele "I saw him".
- In East Timor, the phoneme /ʒ/ sometimes realized as [z], sometimes as [dʒ], is typical of the Creole of Malacca and Singapore and also the Creole of Bidau and the same realization was also found of Portuguese spoken on the island, such as ʒ > z: já [za] ~ [dʒa]; vigésimo (twentieth) [vi.ˈzɛ.zi.mu] ~ [bi.ˈzɛ.zi.mu] ~ [vi.ˈzɛ.si.mu] ~ [bi.ˈzɛ.si.mu].

=== Homophones in dialects ===
==== Mau and mal ====
Both mean bad, but mau is an adjective, mal an adverb. In most parts of Brazil, the l before consonants and ending words, which represents a velarized alveolar lateral approximant in differing dialects, became a labio-velar approximant, making both words homophones.

==== Júri and jure ====
While júri means jury, jure is the imperative and second subjunctive third singular form of jurar, "may he/she swear". In different contexts, unstressed /e/ often became a close front unrounded vowel, but in some Southern Brazilian dialects, /e/ never goes through the change.

==== Comprimento and cumprimento ====
Comprimento means "length", and cumprimento means "greeting". The same thing that happened with /e/ in the example of júri/jure happened to the letter /o/, such becomes a close back rounded vowel in some cases. Hispanic influence makes it never represent that sound in some Southern Brazilian.

==== Asa and haja ====
Asa means "wing", and haja is the imperative and second subjunctive third singular form of haver, "may he/she exist". The words are usually distinguished, but in Alto Trás-os-Montes and for some East Timorese Portuguese speakers, they are homophones, both voiced palato-alveolar sibilants.

==== Boa and voa ====
Boa means "good" (feminine) and voa, "he/she/it flies". Unlike most of the West Iberian languages, Portuguese usually distinguishes between the voiced bilabial plosive and the voiced labiodental fricative, but the distinction used to be absent in the dialects of the northern half of Portugal, and in Uruguayan Portuguese. In these varieties, both are realized indistinctly as a voiced bilabial plosive or a voiced bilabial fricative, as in Spanish.

==== Más, mas and mais ====
Más means "bad ones" (feminine), mas means "but" and mais means "more" or "most". In Northeastern Brazil and the metropolitan area of Rio de Janeiro, the vowels followed by coronal fricatives in the same syllable have a palatal approximant pronounced between both. The feature is very distinguishable since this combination appears in the plural forms.

==== Xá and chá ====
Xá means "shah", and chá means tea. At the beginning of words, ⟨x⟩ and ⟨ch⟩ are usually voiceless palato-alveolar fricatives, but ⟨ch⟩ is a voiceless palato-alveolar affricate in northern Portugal. The sound happens in other cases in Southeastern Brazil but disappeared in the rest of the Portuguese-speaking world.

== Other differences ==
Terms for modern elements often differ between variations of Portuguese, sometimes even taking different genders. The following is a basic description of the PlayStation videogame console:

English	The PlayStation is a video game console.
European Portuguese	A PlayStation é uma consola de videojogos.
Brazilian Portuguese	O PlayStation é um console de videogame.

In this sentence, not only is "PlayStation" feminine in one dialect and masculine in another (because "console" has different genders), but the words for "console" and "videogame" are adapted from English in Portugal (because "consola" is actually adapted from French, where the word "console" is feminine) but retained in their original form in Brazil, and "video game" in the phrase "video game console" is pluralized in Portugal but singular in Brazil.

== Mixed languages ==
Portuñol/Portunhol: In regions where Spanish and Portuguese coexist, various types of language contact have occurred, ranging from improvised code-switching between monolingual speakers of each language to more or less stable mixed languages.

== Closely related languages ==
This section does not cover Galician, which is treated as a separate language from Portuguese by Galician official institutions, or Fala. For a discussion of the controversy regarding the status of Galician with respect to Portuguese, see Reintegrationism.

Uruguayan Portuguese is spoken in the region between Uruguay and Brazil, particularly in the twin cities of Rivera and Santana do Livramento.

The language must not be confused with Portuñol, since it is not a mixing of Spanish and Portuguese, but a variety of Portuguese language developed in Uruguay back in the time of its first settlers. It has since received influence from Uruguayan Spanish and Brazilian Portuguese.

In academic circles, the Portuguese used by the northern population of Uruguay received the name "Dialectos Portugueses del Uruguay" (Uruguayan Portuguese Dialects). There's still no consensus if the language(s) is (are) a dialect or a creole, although the name given by linguists uses the term "dialect". There is also no consensus on how many varieties it has, with some studies indicating that there are at least two varieties, an urban one and a rural one, while others say there are six varieties, of which Riverense Portuñol (Portunhol Riverense) is one. This Portuguese spoken in Uruguay is also referred by its speakers, depending on the region that they live, as Bayano, Riverense, Fronteiriço, Brasileiro or simply Portunhol.

== Mutual comprehension ==
The different dialects and accents do not block cross-understanding among the educated. Meanwhile, the basilects have diverged more. The unity of the language is reflected in the fact that early imported sound films were dubbed into one version for the entire Portuguese-speaking market. Currently, films not originally in Portuguese (usually Hollywood productions) are dubbed separately into two accents: one for Portugal and one for Brazil; the accent used for Portugal is also the one used for Portuguese-speaking Africa and Macau, and now even in East Timor, except using regionalisms. When dubbing an African character in cartoons and TV and film productions, Portuguese people usually mimic an Angolan accent, as it is also commonly seen as the African accent of Portuguese. The popularity of telenovelas and music familiarizes the speakers with other accents of Portuguese.

Prescription and a common cultural and literary tradition, among other factors, have contributed to the formation of a Standard Portuguese, which is the preferred form in formal settings, and is considered indispensable in academic and literary writing, the media, etc. This standard tends to disregard local grammatical, phonetic and lexical peculiarities, and draws certain extra features from the commonly acknowledged canon, preserving (for example) certain verb tenses considered "bookish" or archaic in most other dialects. Portuguese has two official written standards, (i) Brazilian Portuguese (used chiefly in Brazil) and (ii) European Portuguese (used in Portugal and Angola, Cape Verde, East Timor, Guinea-Bissau, Macau, Mozambique, and São Tomé and Príncipe). The written standards slightly differ in spelling and vocabulary, and are legally regulated. Unlike the written language, however, there is no spoken-Portuguese official standard, but the European Portuguese reference pronunciation is the educated speech of Lisbon.

== List of dialects ==
European Portuguese		American Portuguese		African Portuguese	Portuguese language in Asia and Oceania
European Portuguese	Close WIL	Brazilian Portuguese	Other countries and contact dialects		
Central-Southern; Alentejano; Algarvian; Baixo-Beirão, Alto-Alentejano; Estremenho; Lisboeta; Coimbrese; Northern; Alto-Minhoto; Beirão; Transmontano; Insular; Azorean; Madeiran	Galician; Eonavian; Fala; Barranquenho; Mirandese; Asturian; Leonese	Northeastern group; North Coast; Baiano; Northeastern (nordestino); Recifense; Central group; Mineiro; Sertanejo; Caipira; Rio de Janeiro group; Fluminense; Carioca; Brasiliense; Southern group; Paulista (includes Paulistano); Southern (sulista); Florianopolitan; Gaúcho; Northern; Northern (nortista); Amazon Range	Uruguayan Portuguese; Portuñol/Portunhol; Papiamento	Angolan Portuguese; Benguelense; Luandense; Sulista; Cape Verdean Portuguese; Guinean Portuguese; Mozambican Portuguese; São Tomean Portuguese; Annobonese Creole	Indo-Portuguese creoles; East Timorese Portuguese; Goan Portuguese; Macanese Portuguese; Kristang language; Macanese Patois

== See also ==
- Dialects
- Portuguese phonology
- Galician
- Fala

== Notes ==
According to researcher Felisberto Dias in the article Origens do Português Micaelense, the dialects from Beira Baixa and Northern Portalegre (Northern Portalegre dialect is a variety of Beira Baixa dialect to south of Tagus river), Far Western Algarve, Madeira and São Miguel Island descend from the old dialect of Beira Baixa where in the 12th and 13th centuries there was some settlement by people that came mainly from Southern France (Occitan speakers) and also some from Northern France (Oïl languages speakers) that influenced the phonetics of the Galician-Portuguese dialect that was spoken in this region (very depopulated in the wars between Christians and Muslims). Some place names (toponyms) in Beira Baixa and Northern Alto-Alentejo like Proença-a-Velha, Proença-a-Nova (from Old Occitan name Proença - Provence), Ródão (from Rhodanus river), Fratel, Tolosa (from the Occitan name of Toulouse), Nisa (from Niça, Occitan name of Nice) testify a Southern France (Occitan) origin of those settlers. Those people came in the background of the Christian Reconquest (Reconquista) and Repopulation (Repovoamento) of frontier regions and were organized and helped by the military orders of the Knights Templar and Knights Hospitaller (ancestor of today's Order of Malta) among others. With the end of Christian Reconquest in Portugal (1249) speakers of this dialect came to settle in western Algarve. When, at the beginning of the 14th century, the Knights Templar were abolished, in Portugal they were replaced by the Order of Christ (Ordem de Cristo) and many of their members were the same the only difference being that it started to be a Portuguese Crown military order. Later, when Madeira and Azores were discovered, Order of Christ had an important role in the settlement of the islands. Gonçalo Velho Cabral (?-before 1500) was a knight of this military order, he was from Beira Baixa Province (Castelo Branco District) and had the lordship of several lands in Beira Baixa. He was appointed hereditary landowner responsible for administering Crown lands of São Miguel and Santa Maria islands and commissioned by Henry, the Navigator (1394-1460) (then Governor of the Order of Christ) to settle with people the then unpopulated islands. Many people that went to São Miguel Island came from the lands where he was lord and spoke the ancestor of the dialect of São Miguel island. Summing Felisberto Dias research, São Miguel island dialect (Micaelense) is the result of the settlement, in the 15th and 16th centuries, of people that were mainly from Beira Baixa and spoke a dialect that was a descendant from a Gallo-Romance phonetically influenced Galician-Portuguese dialect that formed in the Middle Ages (people from other regions of Portugal and outside of Portugal also went to settle but were assimilated by the majority). Contrary to a very diffused but wrong idea, São Miguel island dialect is not the result of any kind of 15th century French settlement in the island (from which there is no proof). The other islands in the Azores were largely populated by Portuguese from other regions. A small minority of Flemish were present in the initial settlement of Central Group islands of the Azores, mostly in Faial, and some also in Pico and São Jorge, but were rapidly surpassed in number and assimilated by the Portuguese settlers some decades after the initial settlement of the islands in the 15th century. Because of that, Flemish (southern dialect of Dutch) did not phonetically influenced the Portuguese dialects of these islands and on the contrary, Faial island dialect is close to the dialect that is the basis of standard Portuguese.
