= Florianopolitan dialect =

Brazilian Portuguese variety of Florianópolis

- florianopolitano
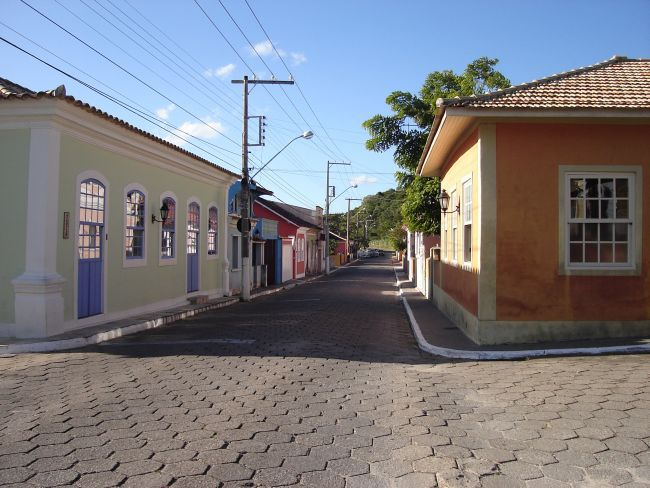
- A view of Ribeirão da Ilha, an Azorean settlement in Florianópolis, where Florianopolitan dialect is traditionally spoken.
- Native to: Brazil
- Region: Florianópolis
- Ethnicity: Azorean Brazilians
- Language family: Indo-European: Italic; Latin; Romance; Western Romance; Ibero-Romance; West-Iberian; Galician-Portuguese; Portuguese; Brazilian Portuguese; Florianopolitan dialect
- Early form: Azorean dialect
- Writing system: Portuguese alphabet

Language codes
- ISO 639-3: –
- Florianópolis in Santa Catarina (state), Brazil.

Florianopolitan dialect is a variety of Brazilian Portuguese. It is spoken by inhabitants of Florianópolis (the capital of Santa Catarina state) of full or predominant Azorean descent and in cities near the capital but with slight variations. The dialect was originally brought by immigrants from Azores who founded several settlements in the Santa Catarina island from the 18th century onwards. The isolation of their settlements made Florianopolitan differ significantly from both Standard European and Brazilian Portuguese.

Once widely spoken in the Santa Catarina island, the Florianopolitan dialect is now almost restricted to the traditional Azorean settlements, and the standard Brazilian Portuguese became the predominant variant for the island inhabitants, many of which come from other parts of Santa Catarina state, other Brazilian states, or even other countries.

== Phonology ==
Florianopolitan is not a uniform dialect, and there are many variations, depending on the community and generation of the speaker. However, here are several principal characteristics of the Florianopolitan dialect speech:

- An 's' is often pronounced [ʃ] before a 'c', 'p', 'qu', or 'e'. It is also pronounced [ʃ] at the end of a word, very softly. The phrase as festas (the parties) is thus pronounced [ɐʃˈfɛʃtɐʃ] or [ɐʃˈfɛʃtɐ].
- An 's', before a 'd', 'm' or 'n', is pronounced [ʒ]. Thus, mesma (same) is pronounced [ˈmɛʒmɐ].
- /t/ and /d/ are pronounced respectively as [t] and [d] even before /i/. In most of Southeastern Brazil, they are affricates [tʃ] and [dʒ].
- Both word-initial and preconsonantal /ʁ/ are glottal [h], but there is some variation. Some speakers, the older generations, use an alveolar trill [r], as in Spanish, Galician, old varieties and some rural developments of European Portuguese, and some other Southern Brazilian Portuguese dialects. Others pronounce it as a uvular trill [ʀ] or a voiceless dorsal fricative, velar [x] or uvular [χ].
- As in Caipira dialects and most speakers of Fluminense dialect, word-final /ʁ/ is deleted unless the next word is without a pause and starts with a vowel.

== Forms of address ==
The Florianopolitan dialect retains forms of address that are obsolete elsewhere in Brazil.

Tu is used, along with its corresponding verb forms, to address people of the same or lesser age, social or professional status, or to show intimacy, as between relatives or friends. "Você" is reserved for outsiders or to people of lesser status to stress lack of intimacy. Usage is obsolete in most of Brazil but is not exclusive to Florianópolis.

O senhor/A senhora is used to address people of a greater age or status or to preserve a respectful distance. In many families, children (especially adult children) address their parents this way (Standard Portuguese, used in all of Brazil).

Indirect third-person address can be used for those of an intermediate status, especially if one wants to be affectionate or welcoming. A solicitous grandchild might ask, "A avó quer mais café?" A respectful student could say, "O professor pode repetir a pergunta?" A 30-year-old man entering a shop for the first time will be greeted, "Que queria o moço?" (in European Portuguese).

== Vocabulary ==
Florianopolitan dialect	Standard Portuguese	English	Usage	Examples	Notes
A três por dois	Com demasiada frequencia	Too often		Ele vem à minha casa a três por dois – He comes to my home too often	Literally "at three for two". Widespread in Brazil but not typical of Florianópolis.
Acachapado	Muito triste, deprimido	Very sad, depressed	"Triste", "deprimido" are the usual words in Florianópolis.		Widespread in at least Southern Brazil but not typical of Florianópolis.
Antanho	Antigamente	Of old	"Antigamente" is the usual word in Florianópolis.		In most of Brazil, it is considered archaic or bookish.
Bispar	Espiar	To spy	"Espiar" is the usual word in Florianópolis.		In most of Brazil, it means "to understand" or "to grasp."
Cabreiro	Desconfiado	Distrustful	"Desconfiado" is the usual word in Florianópolis.	Used only in a colloquial register.	Widespread in Brazil but not typical of Florianópolis.
Na casa do chapéu	Muito longe	Very far (away)	Literally "in the house of the hat." Used only in colloquial register for (sometimes humorous) emphasis. "Muito longe" is the usual wording in Florianópolis.	Essa loja fica na casa do chapéu – This shop is really far away	Widespread in Brazil but not typical of Florianópolis.
Esculacho	Repreensão	Rebuke	Used only in a colloquial register.		Widespread in at least Southern Brazil but not typical of Florianópolis.
Gervão	Lagarta	Caterpillar
Mal de bitaca	Sem dinheiro	Broke (without money)	Actually a local slang.	Estou muito mal de bitaca – I am really quite broke.
Rapariga	Rapariga (feminine form of "rapaz")	Teenage girl, young adult woman	Standard Portuguese but, in other parts of Brazil, archaic or, especially in the popular or colloquial registers, may stand for "prostitute."

== See also ==
- Brazilian Portuguese
- Portuguese dialects
- Portuguese phonology
