= Sertaneja =

Sertaneja and Sertanejo are Brazilian terms that may refer to:

- Sertanejo people, an ethnocultural group in Brazil
- Sertaneja, Paraná, a municipality in Paraná, Brazil
- Sertanejo music, a musical genre in Brazil (known as Sertanejo)
- Sertanejo Portuguese, a Brazilian dialect or accent of Brasiliense people in Brasilia
- O sertanejo, a novel by the Brazilian writer José de Alencar
- Viola sertaneja, a stringed musical instrument from North-eastern Brazil
- Sertanejo, nickname of Felipe Arantes, Brazilian mixed martial artist
