= The Caipira Dialect =

1920 book by Amadeu Amaral

- Author: Amadeu Amaral
- Original title: O Dialecto Caipira
- Publication date: 1920

The Caipira Dialect: grammar, vocabulary (in Portuguese: O Dialecto Caipira: gramática, vocabulário) is a book written by the poet and philologist Amadeu Amaral, published in São Paulo in 1920. It was the first study of the Caipira dialect and the first dialectological study in Brazil.
