= Paulistano dialect =

Accent or dialect of Brazilian Portuguese spoken in São Paulo

- Paulistano
- Pronunciation: Portuguese pronunciation: [pawlisˈtɜ~ɜ̃nʊ]
- Native to: Brazil
- Region: São Paulo
- Language family: Indo-European: Italic; Latin; Romance; Western Romance; Ibero-Romance; West-Iberian; Galician-Portuguese; Portuguese; Brazilian Portuguese; Paulistano dialect

Language codes
- ISO 639-3: –
- São Paulo within its state

Paulistano (Portuguese pronunciation: [pawlisˈtɐ̃nu]) is the Brazilian Portuguese term for the characteristic accent spoken in São Paulo, Brazil's largest and richest city, and some neighboring areas in the São Paulo Macrometropolis. The Paulistano and Carioca accents are dominant in Brazilian mass media and the most influential ones in modern Brazil.

== History ==
The Paulistano dialect was influenced by immigrants who arrived in the city from the late 19th century onwards, chiefly the Italians. In the early 20th century, Italian and its dialects were widely spoken in São Paulo and they eventually merged into locally spoken Portuguese.

== Phonological features ==
- Raising of the near-open central vowel /ɐ/, as in pug [ˈpɘ.gɪ], as well as fronting of its nasalized variants, as in Amanda [aˈmɘ̃.dɐ], phenomena that are seemingly more frequent in the upper-middle class.
- Diphthongization of the nasal vowel /eN/ in words such as entendendo [ẽj̃.tẽj̃ˈdẽj̃.dʊ] and tempo [ˈtẽj̃.pʊ], predominantly observed among female speakers and in higher social classes.
- Palatalization of the stops /t/ and /d/ before the close front vowel [i] among younger generations, as in most Portuguese dialects spoken in the Southeast: tio [ˈtʃiu] and dia [ˈdʒi.ɐ].
- The fricatives /s/ and /z/ are not palatalized. Examples: véspera [ˈvɛs.pe.ɾɐ], isto [ˈis.tu], desde [ˈdez.dʒi].
- /R/ in mid-word coda position is pronounced either as [ɾ] or [ɹ], with the former being more prestigious. Example: carta [ˈkaɾtɐ] / [ˈkaɹtɐ].
- Word-final /R/ in infinitives is often not pronounced at all depending on speaker and register as most portuguese dialects spoken in Brazil. Example: cantar [kɐ̃ˈta].

== See also ==
- Brazilian Portuguese
- Portuguese dialects
- Portuguese phonology
- São Paulo
