= Portuguese phonology =

Sounds and pronunciation of Portuguese

The phonology of Portuguese varies among dialects, in extreme cases leading to some difficulties in mutual intelligibility. This article on phonology focuses on the pronunciations that are generally regarded as standard. Since Portuguese is a pluricentric language, differences between European Portuguese (EP), Brazilian Portuguese (BP), and Angolan Portuguese (AP) can be considerable. Varieties are distinguished whenever necessary hereafter.

== Consonants ==
The consonant inventory of Portuguese is fairly conservative. The medieval Galician-Portuguese system of seven sibilants (/ts dz/, /ʃ ʒ/, /tʃ/, and apicoalveolar /s̺ z̺/) is still distinguished in spelling (intervocalic c/ç z, x g/j, ch, ss -s- respectively), but is reduced to the four fricatives /s z ʃ ʒ/ by the merger of /tʃ/ into /ʃ/ and apicoalveolar /s̺ z̺/ into either /s z/ or /ʃ ʒ/ (depending on dialect and syllable position), except in parts of northern Portugal (most notably in the Trás-os-Montes region). Other than this, there have been no other significant changes to the consonant phonemes since Old Portuguese. However, several consonant phonemes have special allophones at syllable boundaries (often varying quite significantly between European and Brazilian Portuguese), and a few also undergo allophonic changes at word boundaries.

Consonant phonemes of Portuguese
		Labial	Dental/ Alveolar	Palatal (-alveolar)	Velar/Uvular	
		Labial	Dental/ Alveolar	Palatal (-alveolar)	plain	labial
Nasal		m	n	ɲ		
Plosive	voiceless	p	t ~ (tʃ)		k ~ (kʷ)	
Plosive	voiced	b	d ~ (dʒ)		ɡ ~ (ɡʷ)	
Fricative	voiceless	f	s	ʃ	ʁ	
Fricative	voiced	v	z	ʒ	ʁ	
Sonorant	median		ɾ	j	ʁ	w
Sonorant	lateral		l	ʎ		

Phonetic notes

- The semivowel approximants /j, w/ contrast with unstressed high vowels in verbal conjugation, as in (eu) rio /ˈʁi.u/ 'I laugh' and (ele) riu /ˈʁiw/ 'he (has) laughed.' Phonologists debate whether their nature is vocalic or consonantal. Between vowels, semivowels are ambisyllabic: they are associated to both the previous syllable and the following syllable onset.
- In Brazil and Angola, the consonant hereafter denoted as /ɲ/ is realized as a nasal palatal approximant [j̃], which nasalizes the vowel that precedes it: ninho ([ˈnĩj̃u ~ ˈnʲĩj̃u ~ ˈɲĩj̃u] in Brazil, [ˈnĩj̃u] in Angola) 'nest'.
- [nʲ ~ ɲ] is often the pronunciation of a sequence of /n/ followed by /i/ in a rising diphthong in Brazil, forming a minimal pair between sonha [ˈsoj̃ɐ] and Sônia [ˈsoniɐ ~ ˈsonʲɐ ~ ˈsoɲɐ]; menina, "girl" [miˈninɐ ~ miˈnʲinɐ ~ miˈɲinɐ].
- [lʲ ~ ʎ] is often the pronunciation of a sequence of /l/ followed by /i/ in a rising diphthong in Brazil; e.g. limão, "lemon" [liˈmɐ̃w̃ ~ lʲiˈmɐ̃w̃ ~ ʎiˈmɐ̃w̃]; sandália, "sandal" [sɐ̃ˈdaliɐ ~ sɐ̃ˈdalʲɐ ~ sɐ̃ˈdaʎɐ].
- The consonant /l/ is velarized [ɫ] in all positions in European Portuguese, even before front vowels. In Portugal, the unvelarized lateral appears only in non-standard dialects.
- The consonant hereafter denoted as /ʁ/ has a variety of realizations depending on dialect. In Europe, it is typically a voiced uvular fricative [ʁ]. There is also a realization as a voiceless uvular fricative [χ], and the original pronunciation as an alveolar trill [r] also remains very common in various dialects. A common realization of the word-initial /ʁ/ in the Lisbon accent is a voiced uvular fricative trill [ʀ̝]. In Africa and Asia, the classical alveolar trill is still mostly dominant, due to separate development from European Portuguese. In Brazil, /ʁ/ can be velar, uvular, or glottal and may be voiceless unless between voiced sounds; it is usually pronounced as a voiceless velar fricative [x], a voiceless glottal fricative [h] or voiceless uvular fricative [χ]. See also Guttural R in Portuguese. All these variants are transcribed with ⟨ʁ⟩ in this article.
- /s/ and /z/ are normally lamino-alveolar, as in English. However, a number of dialects in northern Portugal pronounce /s/ and /z/ as apico-alveolar sibilants [s̺, z̺] which are exactly the same as the ones found in Catalan and Northern European Spanish. Those apico-alveolars sound like duller versions of /s/ and /z/, but they are kept apart from /ʃ, ʒ/ (written ch/x and j/g) which are laminal postalveolar. A small number of northeastern Portugal dialects still retain the medieval distinction between apical and laminal sibilants (written s/ss and c/ç/z, respectively), a distinction also found in Mirandese and analogous to the distinción of European Spanish.
- As phonemes, /tʃ/ and /dʒ/ occur only in assimilated (e.g. tchau "goodbye" /tʃaw/) or unassimilated loanwords (e.g. dee jay "DJ" /di dʒej/), with a tendency for speakers to substitute into fricatives in Portugal. However, in most Brazilian dialects t and d are pronounced as [tʃ] and [dʒ] before [i], [ĩ], consonants and at the end of words (e.g. tio, pedinte, atmosfera, round).
- In northern and central Portugal, the voiced stops /b/, /d/, /ɡ/ are usually lenited to fricatives [β], [ð], and [ɣ] respectively, except at the beginning of words, or after nasal vowels; a similar process occurs in Spanish.
- In large parts of northern Portugal, e.g. Trás-os-Montes, and also in East Timor and the islands of Flores, /b/ and /v/ are merged, both pronounced [b ~ β], as in Spanish.
- /ʃ/ and /ʒ/ are realized as [ɕ] and [ʑ] in all positions by a considerable quantity of dialects, especially before [i] and [ĩ]. Because of this, it is mostly agreed upon that the alveolo-palatal fricatives are also valid descriptions of the /ʃ/ and /ʒ/ phonemes.

=== Rhotics ===
The occurrence of the two rhotic phonemes /ʁ/ and /ɾ/ is mostly predictable by context, with dialectal variations in realization.

The rhotic is predicted to be "hard" (i.e., /ʁ/) in the following circumstances:

- Syllable-initially when not following an oral vowel (e.g., rosa 'rose', guelra 'gill')
- Following a nasal vowel (e.g., honrar 'to honor')
- Syllable-finally, in most Brazilian and some African dialects

The rhotic is predicted to be "soft" (i.e., /ɾ/) when it occurs in syllable onset clusters (e.g., atributo) or, in some dialects, syllable-finally.

The rhotic phonemes /ʁ/ and /ɾ/ contrast only between an oral vowel and a vowel, similar to Spanish. In this context, they are spelled "rr" and "r", respectively.

This restricted variation has prompted several authors to postulate a single rhotic phoneme. Câmara (1953) and Mateus & d'Andrade (2000) see the soft as the unmarked realization and that instances of intervocalic [ʁ] result from gemination and a subsequent deletion rule (i.e., carro /ˈkaro/ > [ˈkaɾʁu] > [ˈkaʁu]). Conversely, Bonet & Mascaró (1997) argue that the hard is the unmarked realization.

==== Brazilian rhotics ====
In addition to the phonemic variation between /ʁ/ and /ɾ/ between vowels, up to four allophones of the "merged" phoneme /R/ are found in other positions:

1. A "soft" allophone /ɾ/ in syllable-onset clusters, as described above;
2. A default "hard" allophone in most other circumstances;
3. In some dialects, a special allophone syllable-finally (i.e., preceded but not followed by a vowel);
4. Commonly in all dialects, deletion of the rhotic word-finally.

The default hard allophone is some sort of voiceless fricative in most dialects, e.g., [χ] [h] [x], although other variants are also found. For example, an alveolar trill [r] is found in certain conservative dialects down São Paulo, of Italian-speaking, Spanish-speaking, Arabic-speaking, or Slavic-speaking influence. A uvular trill [ʀ] is found in areas of German-speaking, French-speaking, and Portuguese-descended influence throughout coastal Brazil down Espírito Santo, most prominently Rio de Janeiro.

The syllable-final allophone shows the greatest variation:

- Many dialects (mainly in Brasília, Minas Gerais and Brazilian North and Northeast) use the same voiceless fricative as in the default allophone. This may become voiced before a voiced consonant, esp. in its weaker variants (e.g., dormir [doɦˈmi(h)] 'to sleep').
- The soft [ɾ] occurs for many speakers in Southern Brazil and São Paulo city.
- An English-like approximant [ɹ ~ ɻ] or vowel (R-colored vowel) occurs elsewhere in São Paulo as well as Mato Grosso do Sul, southern Goiás, central and southern Mato Grosso and bordering regions of Minas Gerais, as well as in the urban areas in the Sinos river valley. This pronunciation is stereotypically associated with the rural "caipira" dialect.

Throughout Brazil, deletion of the word-final rhotic is common, regardless of the "normal" pronunciation of the syllable-final allophone. This pronunciation is particularly common in lower registers, although found in most registers in some areas, e.g., Northeast Brazil, and in the more formal and standard sociolect. It occurs especially in verbs, which always end in R in their infinitive form; in words other than verbs, the deletion is rarer and seems not to occur in monosyllabic non-verb words, such as mar. Evidence of this allophone is often encountered in writing that attempts to approximate the speech of communities with this pronunciation, e.g., the rhymes in the popular poetry (cordel literature) of the Northeast and phonetic spellings (e.g., amá, sofrê in place of amar, sofrer) in Jorge Amado's novels (set in the Northeast) and Gianfrancesco Guarnieri's play Eles não usam black tie (about favela dwellers in Rio de Janeiro).

The soft realization is often maintained across word boundaries in close syntactic contexts (e.g., mar azul [ˈmaɾ aˈzuw] 'blue sea').

=== Consonant phonotactics ===
Syllables have the maximal structure of CCVVCC. The majority of syllables are open (end in a vowel), with CV syllables found to compose 60% of a corpus of Portuguese, followed by CVC (15%) and V (8%). Syllables ending in a consonant generally end in one of the single consonants /S/, /l/, /R/, /N/ (where "/S/" represents an unspecified coda sibilant, "/R/" an unspecified coda rhotic, and "/N/" represents nasalization, which can be phonologically analyzed as a postvocalic segment despite being phonetically realized by nasalizing the vowel): European Portuguese allows coda /ʃ/, /l/ and /ɾ/, and Brazilian Portuguese allows coda /s/ and /ʁ/ (or in a minority of dialects, /ʃ, ɾ/). Syllables ending in two consonants are very rare, and involve a sibilant preceded by another consonant; examples include the first syllables of perspicaz and solstício.

Phonotactic rules concerning onset consonants:

- The native Portuguese consonant clusters, where there is not epenthesis, are sequences of a non-sibilant oral consonant followed by the liquids /ɾ/ or /l/, and the complex consonants /ks, kw, ɡw/. Some examples: flagrante /flɐˈɡɾɐ̃tɨ/, complexo /kõˈplɛksu/, fixo /ˈfiksu/ (but not ficção /fikˈsɐ̃w/), latex /ˈlatɛks/, quatro /ˈkʷatɾu/, guaxinim /ɡʷɐʃiˈnĩ/, /ɡʷaʃiˈnĩ/
- The consonants /ʎ/ and /ɲ/ occur word-initially only in a few borrowed words and in forms of the clitic pronoun lhe. They are almost always found in the middle of a word between vowels, and are rare before /i/.
- The semivowels /j/ and /w/ do not occur before /i/ and /u/ respectively.
- Regarding Brazilian Portuguese, Bisol (2005:122) analyzes the phonetic clusters at the start of words like qual and guardar as separate phonemes, /kʷ/ and /ɡʷ/, rather than as /k/ or /g/ followed by /w/ in phonemic sequence. This is because when /k/ or /g/ is combined with a different approximant or when /w/ is combined with a different initial consonant, the relevant approximant can always be alternatively realized as a full vowel in Brazilian Portuguese: quiabo [ˈkjabu ~ kiˈabu], guiar [ˈɡja(h) ~ ɡiˈa(h)], suar [ˈswa(h) ~ suˈa(h)]. However, this alternation can never apply to the phonetic clusters [kw] and [gw]: qual and guardar in Brazilian Portuguese are always [ˈkwaw] and [ɡwaɦˈda(h)], never *[kuˈaw] or *[ɡu.aɦˈda(h)].

Phonotactic rules concerning coda consonants:

- Although nasal consonants do not normally occur at the end of syllables, syllable-final /n/ may be present in rare learned words, such as abdómen ([abˈdɔmɛn] 'abdomen'). In Brazilian varieties, these words have a nasal diphthong ([abˈdõmẽj̃], spelled as abdômen).
- While the sibilant consonants (/s z ʃ ʒ/) contrast word-initially and intervocalically, they appear in complementary distribution in the syllable coda. For many dialects (i.e., those of Portugal and of Rio de Janeiro and the northeast of Brazil and certain other areas in Brazil), the sibilant is a postalveolar in coda position (e.g., pasto [ˈpaʃtu] 'pasture'; futurismo [futuˈɾiʒmu] 'futurism'; paz [pa(j)ʃ] 'peace'). In many other dialects of Brazil (e.g., some of the Southeast, Northeast, and North), the postalveolar variant occurs in some or all cases when directly preceding a consonant, including across word boundaries, but not word-finally (e.g., [ˈpaʃtu ~ ˈpastu], [futuˈɾiʒmu ~ futuˈɾizmu], [pa(j)s]). In a number of Brazilian dialects, this "palatalization" is absent entirely (e.g., [ˈpastu], [ˈizmu], [pa(j)s]). Voicing contrast is also neutralized, with [ʒ] or [z] occurring before voiced consonants and [ʃ] or [s] appearing before voiceless consonants and before a pause (e.g., pasta [ˈpaʃtɐ] or [ˈpastɐ], 'paste'; Islão (or Islã) [iʒˈlɐ̃w̃] or [izˈlɐ̃], 'Islam'). In the vast majority of dialects, however, word-final "s" and "z" are pronounced /z/ before vowels (e.g. os ovos [uz ˈɔvuʃ, -s], "the eggs", temos hoje [ˈtemuz ˈoʒɨ], "we have today", faz isso [ˈfaz ˈisu], "do that"). In European dialects, the postalveolar fricatives are only weakly fricated in the syllable coda.
- In most Brazilian dialects, /l/ is vocalized to [w] at the end of syllables, but in the dialects of the extreme south, mainly along the frontiers with other countries (especially Uruguay), it has the full pronunciation or the velarized pronunciation. In some caipira registers, there is a rhotacism of coda /l/ to retroflex [ɻ]. In casual BP, unstressed il can be realized as [ju], as in fácil [ˈfasju] ('easy').
- For speakers who realize /ʁ/ as an alveolar trill [r], the sequence [ʒr] (as in e.g., os rins) can coalesce into a voiced alveolar fricative trill [r̝].
- The semivowels /j/ and /w/ only contrast in some diphthongs like in pai [ˈpaj] versus pau [ˈpaw]. Otherwise they are the non-syllabic allophones of /i/ and /u/ in unstressed syllables.

==== Epenthesis ====
In BP, an epenthetic vowel [i] is sometimes inserted between consonants, to break up consonant clusters that are not native to Portuguese, in learned words and in borrowings. This also happens at the ends of words after consonants that cannot occur word-finally (e.g., /d/, /k/, /f/). For example, psicologia ('psychology') may be pronounced [pisikoloˈʒiɐ]; adverso ('adverse') may be pronounced [adʒiˈvɛʁsu]; McDonald's may be pronounced [mɛkiˈdõnawdʒis]. In northern Portugal, an epenthetic [ɨ] may be used instead, [pɨsikuluˈʒiɐ], [ɐðɨˈβɛɾsu], but in southern Portugal there is often no epenthesis, [psikuluˈʒiɐ], [ɐdˈvɛɾsu]. Epenthesis at the end of a word does not normally occur in Portugal.

Epenthetic vowels are traditionally unstressed in BP, but some verbs have alternative pronunciations that display innovative stress on an originally epenthetic vowel: for example, adapto "I adapt" and opto "I opt" can be pronounced in BP either as [aˈdapitʊ], [ˈɔpitʊ] (traditional stress pattern) or as [adaˈpitʊ], [oˈpitʊ] (innovative stress pattern).

==== Consonant elision ====
There is a variation in the pronunciation of the first consonant of certain clusters, most commonly C or P in cç, ct, pç and pt. These consonants may be variably elided or conserved. For some words, this variation may exist inside a country, sometimes in all of them; for others, the variation is dialectal, with the consonant being always pronounced in one country and always elided in the other. This variation affects 0.5% of the language's vocabulary, or 575 words out of 110,000. In most cases, Brazilians variably conserve the consonant while speakers elsewhere have invariably ceased to pronounce it (for example, detector in Brazil versus detetor in Portugal). The inverse situation is rarer, occurring in words such as fa(c)to and conta(c)to (consonants never pronounced in Brazil, pronounced elsewhere). Until 2009, this reality could not be apprehended from the spelling: while Brazilians did not write consonants that were no longer pronounced, the spelling of the other countries retained them in many words as silent letters, usually when there was still a vestige of their presence in the pronunciation of the preceding vowel. This could give the false impression that European Portuguese was phonologically more conservative in this aspect, when in fact it was Brazilian Portuguese that retained more consonants in pronunciation.

Examples
Example		Gloss
fa(c)to	[ˈfa(k)tu]	'fact'
pacto	[ˈpaktu]	'pact'
ta(c)to	[ˈta(k)tu]	'tact'

Unlike its neighbor and relative Spanish, Brazilian Portuguese lacks a tendency to elide any stop, including those that may become a continuant by lenition (/b/ > [β], /d/ > [ð], /ɡ/ > [ɣ]), but it has a number of allophones to replace someone of them.

== Vowels ==
Monophthongs of European Portuguese as they are pronounced in Lisbon, from Cruz-Ferreira (1995:91). The vowel transcribed /ɯ/ on this chart appears only in unstressed syllables and corresponds to the symbol /ɨ/ in this article.

Monophthongs of Brazilian Portuguese as they are pronounced in São Paulo, from Barbosa & Albano (2004:229). The vowels [ɪ, ʊ, ë] appear only in unstressed syllables.

Portuguese has one of the richest vowel phonologies of all Romance languages, having both oral and nasal vowels, diphthongs, and triphthongs. A phonemic distinction is made between close-mid vowels /e o/ and the open-mid vowels /ɛ ɔ/, as in Catalan, French and Italian, although there is a certain amount of vowel alternation. European Portuguese also has two central vowels, one of which tends to be elided like the e caduc in French.

The central closed vowel [ɨ] occurs in European Portuguese when e is unstressed, e.g. presidente [pɾɨziˈðẽtɨ], as well as in Angola in final syllables, e.g. presidente [pɾeziˈdẽtɨ]. It does not exist in Brazil, e.g. presidente [pɾeziˈdẽtʃi].

In Angola, [a] and [ɐ] appear in complementary distribution, with [ɐ] being restricted to final unstressed syllables and [a] appearing elsewhere rama [ˈʁamɐ]. They can thus be analyzed to be members of one phoneme /a/. The nasal /ɐ̃/ is phonetically open [ã].

In Brazil, [ɐ] appears to be undergoing a process of phonemicization, due to its increasing use in loanwords from English such as pug [ˈpɐgɪ], budget [ˈbɐ(d)ʒetʃɪ], and love [ˈlɐvɪ]. It may represent an emerging vowel category and is raised in some dialects, possibly to enhance phonemic contrast.

Oral vowels
	Front	Central	Back
Close	i	(ɨ)	u
Close-mid	e		o
Open-mid	ɛ	ɐ	ɔ
Open		a	

Nasal vowels
	Front	Central	Back
Close	ĩ		ũ
Close-mid	ẽ		õ
Open-mid		ɐ̃	

Oral diphthongs
		Endpoint	
		/j/	/w/
Start point	/a/	aj	aw
Start point	/ɐ/	ɐj	ɐw
Start point	/ɛ/	ɛj	ɛw
Start point	/e/	ej	ew
Start point	/i/		iw
Start point	/ɔ/	ɔj	
Start point	/o/	oj	ow
Start point	/u/	uj	

Nasal diphthongs
		Endpoint	
		/j̃/	/w̃/
Start point	/ɐ̃/	ɐ̃j̃	ɐ̃w̃
Start point	/ẽ/	ẽj̃	
Start point	/õ/	õj̃	õw̃
Start point	/ũ/	ũj̃	

=== Vowel classification ===
In some cases, Portuguese uses vowel height to contrast stressed syllables with unstressed syllables:

- In Portugal, unstressed /a e o/ tend to be raised to /ɐ ɨ u/, whereas /ɛ ɔ/ remain unchanged. In final syllables, only /ɐ ɨ u/ appear.
- In the Southern, Central-West and Southeast regions of Brazil, unstressed /ɛ ɔ/ are raised to /e o/, whereas in Northern and Northeast regions, they remain open. However, unstressed /a e o/ remain unchanged throughout the whole territory. In final syllables, only /ɐ i u/ appear.
- In Angola, unstressed /a ɛ e ɔ o/ remain unchanged. In final syllables, only /a ɨ u/ appear, with /a/ being allophonically raised to [ɐ] in this position.

See below for details. The dialects of Portugal are characterized by reducing vowels to a greater extent than others. Falling diphthongs are composed of a vowel followed by one of the high vowels /i/ or /u/; although rising diphthongs occur in the language as well, they can be interpreted as hiatuses.

European Portuguese possesses quite a wide range of vowel allophones:

- All vowels are lowered and retracted before /l/: [ɪ, ɤ, u̞, ë̞, o̞, æ̈, ʌ, ɒ, ɑ].
- All vowels are raised and advanced before alveolar, palato-alveolar and palatal consonants: [i, ɯ̽, u, e, o, ɛ, ɐ̝, ɔ, ä̝]. Those are the vowels shown on the chart. The diphthong [ɐj] is an exception to that as it is often pronounced [ʌj] in Lisbon, with a back onset.

Furthermore, Cruz-Ferreira gives voiceless allophones of /ɨ/, /u/, /ɐ/ in the unstressed word-final position.

The exact realization of the /ɐ/ varies somewhat amongst dialects. In Brazil, the vowel can be as high as [ə] in any environment. It is typically closer in stressed syllables before intervocalic nasals /m, n, ɲ/ than word-finally, reaching as open a position as [ɐ] in the latter case, and open-mid [ɜ] before nasals, where /ɐ/ can be nasalized. In European Portuguese, the general situation is similar, except that in some regions the two vowels form minimal pairs in some European dialects. In central European Portuguese this contrast occurs in a limited morphological context, namely in verb conjugation between the first person plural present and past perfect indicative forms of verbs such as pensamos ('we think') and pensámos ('we thought'; spelled ⟨pensamos⟩ in Brazil). Spahr proposes that it is a kind of crasis rather than phonemic distinction of /a/ and /ɐ/. It means that in falamos 'we speak' there is the expected prenasal /a/-raising: [fɐˈlɐmuʃ], while in falámos 'we spoke' there are phonologically two /a/ in crasis: /faˈlaamos/ > [fɐˈlamuʃ] (however, in Brazil both merge, falamos [faˈlɐ̃mus]. In Angola, on the other hand, both merge as well, but spelling keeps differentiated: falamos/falámos [faˈlamuʃ]). Close-mid vowels and open-mid vowels (/e ~ ɛ/ and /o ~ ɔ/) contrast only when they are stressed. In unstressed syllables, they occur in complementary distribution. In Brazilian Portuguese, they are raised to close /i, u/ after a stressed syllable, or in some accents and in general casual speech, also before it.

According to Mateus and d'Andrade (2000:19), in European Portuguese, the stressed /ɐ/ only occurs in the following three contexts:

- Before a palatal consonant (such as telha /ˈtɐʎɐ/)
- Before the palatal front glide (such as lei /ˈlɐj/)
- Before a nasal consonant (such as cama /ˈkɐmɐ/)

English loanwords containing stressed /ʌ/ or /ɜːr/ are usually associated with pre-nasal ⟨a⟩ as in rush, or are influenced by orthography as in clube (club), or both, as in surf/surfe.

=== European Portuguese "e caduc" ===
European Portuguese possesses a near-close near-back unrounded vowel, transcribed /ɨ/ in this article. It occurs in unstressed syllables such as in pegar /pɨˈɡaɾ/ ('to grip').

- Traditionally, all instances of /ɨ/ are pronounced; e.g. **ver**da**de** [vɨɾˈðaðɨ], **pe**rigo [pɨˈɾiɣu], **es**tado [ɨʃˈtaðu].
- In modern European Portuguese, the initial /ɨ/ is fronted to [i]; e.g. **e**nergia /ɨnɨɾˈʒiɐ/ → [inɨɾˈʒiɐ].
- In traditional EP, /i/ was never retracted to [ɨ]. In modern EP, it happens when it is surrounded by /i, ĩ, ɲ, ʎ, ʃ, ʒ/, so that **mi**nistro /miˈniʃtɾu/, prín**cipe** /ˈpɾĩsipɨ/ and ar**ti**lhar /ɐɾtiˈʎaɾ/ are usually pronounced [mɨˈniʃtɾu], [ˈpɾĩsɨpɨ] and [ɐɾtɨˈʎaɾ].
- When "e" is surrounded by another vowel, it becomes [i]; e.g. **real** [ˈʁjal].
- However, when the e caduc is preceded by a semi-vowel, it may be given the unreduced pronunciation of the letter ⟨e⟩, that is [e] or [ɛ]: **poe**sia [pweˈziɐ], **quie**tude [kjɛˈtuðɨ].
- Regardless of the underlying phoneme, a phonetic [ɨ] can be elided, affecting syllabification and sometimes even producing a syllabic consonant; e.g. **ver**da**de** /vɨɾˈda.dɨ/ → [vr̩ˈðað], **pe**rigo /pɨˈɾi.ɡu/ → [ˈpɾi.ɣu], **es**tado /ɨʃˈta.du/ → [ˈʃta.ðu], e**ner**gia /ɨ.nɨɾˈʒi.ɐ/ → [i.nr̩ˈʒi.ɐ], **mi**nistro /miˈniʃ.tɾu/ → [ˈmniʃ.tɾu], prín**cipe** /ˈpɾĩ.si.pɨ/ → [ˈpɾĩsp], ar**ti**lhar /ɐɾ.tiˈʎaɾ/ → [ɐɾtˈʎaɾ], ca**mi**nhar /kɐ.miˈɲaɾ/ → [kɐmˈɲaɾ], **pi**stola /piʃˈtɔ.lɐ/ → [ˈpʃ̩tɔ.lɐ] (here, ⟨r̩⟩ stands for a syllabic alveolar trill with one contact, the syllabic counterpart of [ɾ]). This can result in complex syllable onsets that are typical of Slavic languages.
- Whenever [ɨ] is elided, obstruents in the resulting consonant cluster often agree in voicing, so that the most reduced form of desistiu /dɨziʃˈtiu/ '(he) gave up' surfaces as [tsʃtiu]. /ʁ/, a phonological sonorant, behaves like an obstruent in this case and can also be devoiced in voiceless clusters, as in reconhecer [χkuɲɨˈseɾ] 'to recognize' (phonemically /ʁɨkuɲɨˈseɾ/).

There are very few minimal pairs for this sound, including pregar /pɾɨˈɡaɾ/ ('to nail') vs. pregar /pɾɛˈɡaɾ/ ('to preach'; the latter stemming from earlier preegar < Latin praedicāre) as well as jure /ˈʒuɾɨ/ ('I swear', subjunctive) vs. júri /ˈʒuɾi/ ('jury').

=== Oral diphthongs ===
Diphthongs are not considered independent phonemes in Portuguese, but knowing them can help with spelling and pronunciation.

Diphthong	Usual spelling	Example	Meaning	Notes and variants
/aj/	**ai, ái**	pai náiade	'father' 'naiad'	In Brazil, it may be realized as [a] before a post-alveolar fricative /ʃ, ʒ/, making baixo realized as [ˈbaʃu].
/ɐj/	**ai**	plaina	'jointer'	In several Brazilian dialects; it occurs before nasal consonants and can be nasalised, as in plaina [ˈplɐ̃jnɐ ~ ˈplɐjnɐ ~ ˈplajnɐ].
/ɐj/	**ei, éi, êi**	leite anéis contêiner	'milk' 'rings' 'container'	In Greater Lisbon (except by Setúbal) /e, ɛ/ can be centralized to [ɐ] before palatals /j, ɲ, ʃ, ʒ, ʎ/.; e.g. roupeiro [ʁowˈpejɾu - ʁoˈpɐjɾu], brenha [ˈbɾeɲɐ - ˈbɾɐ(j)ɲɐ], texto [ˈteʃtu - ˈtɐ(j)ʃtu], vejo [ˈveʒu - ˈvɐ(j)ʒu], coelho [kuˈeʎu - kuˈɐ(j)ʎu], anéis [ɐˈnɛjʃ - ɐˈnɐjʃ]. Before /j/, it is often a back vowel [ʌ]: [ɐˈnʌjʃ] etc.
/ej/	**ei, êi**	rei Plêiades	'king' 'Pleiades'	In several vernacular dialects (most of Portugal, Brazil and Lusophone Africa), "ei" may be realized essentially as [e] in unstressed syllables. Words ending on either -eiro or -eira (like roupeiro [ʁoˈpeɾu], bandeira [bɐ̃ˈdeɾɐ], brasileiro [bɾaziˈleɾu], brasileira [bɾaziˈleɾɐ], etc.), when ei precedes a palatal sound (like queijo [ˈkeʒu], deixa [ˈdeʃɐ], etc.), or when ei precedes a consonant in general (like manteiga [mɐ̃ˈteɡɐ], beiço [ˈbesu]) are optionally monophthongized, depending on the speaker and region (comparable to Spanish ropero, bandera, brasilero, brasilera, queso, deja, manteca, bezo). However, notice that when ei makes up part of a Greco-Latin loanword (like diarreico, anarreico, etc.), as well as nouns ending on -ei (like rei [ˈʁej], lei [ˈlej]) and seis, reino keep their palatal sound /ej/ (/ɛj/, in case of -eico ending nouns and adjectives). In most stressed syllables, the pronunciation is /ej/. There are very few minimal pairs for /ej/ and /ɛj/, all of which occur in oxytonic words. In Greater Lisbon, however, it is always pronounced [ɐj].
/ɛj/	**ei**, **éi**	geleia papéis	'jelly' 'papers'	It only occurs in -el plurals like anéis (plural of anel 'ring'). In Greater Lisbon, however, it is always pronounced [ɐj].
/oj/	**oi, ôi**	dois escôiparo	'two' 'I discover'	
/ɔj/	**oi**, **ói**	heroico destrói	'heroic' 'destroys'	Pronounced as /ɔj/ mostly on -oi ending words like herói 'hero', as well as some verbal conjugations.
/uj/	**ui**	fui	'I went'	Usually stressed.
/aw/	**au, áu**	mau áurea	'bad' 'aurea'	
/ɐw/	**au**	saudade trauma	'to miss' 'trauma'	In EP, when unstressed. In several Brazilian dialects; it occurs before nasal consonants and can be nasalised, as in trauma [ˈtɾɐ̃wmɐ ~ ˈtɾɐwmɐ ~ ˈtɾawmɐ].
/ew/	**eu, êu**	seu terapêutico	'your'/'yours' 'therapeutic'	There are very few minimal pairs for /eu/ and /ɛu/, all occurring in oxytonic words.
/ɛw/	**éu**	céu	'sky'	There are very few minimal pairs for /eu/ and /ɛu/, all occurring in oxytonic words.
/iw/	**iu**	viu	'he saw'	Usually stressed.
/ow/	**ou**	ouro	'gold'	Merges optionally with /o/ in most of modern Portuguese dialects, excluding some regions in northern Portugal.

There are also some words with two vowels occurring next to each other like in iate and sábio may be pronounced both as rising diphthongs or hiatus. In these and other cases, other diphthongs, diphthong-hiatus or hiatus-diphthong combinations might exist depending on speaker, such as [uw] or even [uw.wu] for suo ('I sweat'), and in BP [ij] or even [ij.ji] for fatie ('slice it').

[j] and [w] are non-syllabic counterparts of the vowels /i/ and /u/, respectively. At least in European Portuguese, the diphthongs [ɛj, aj, ɐj, ɔj, oj, uj, iw, ew, ɛw, aw] tend to have more central second elements [ɛɪ̯, aɪ̯, ʌɪ̯, ɔɪ̯, oɪ̯, uɪ̯, iʊ̯, eʊ̯, ɛʊ̯, aʊ̯] (as stated above, the starting point of /ɐi/ is typically back) – note that [ʊ̯] is also more weakly rounded than the [u] monophthong.

=== Nasal vowels ===
Nasal vowel	Usual spelling	Example	Meaning
/ɐ̃/	**ã**, **am**, **an**	rã, canto	'frog', 'I sing' or 'corner'
/ẽ/	**em**, **en**	entro	'I enter'
/ĩ/	**im**, **in**	vim	'I came'
/õ/	**õ**, **om**, **on**	sombra	'shadow'
/ũ/	**um**, **un**	mundo	'world'

Portuguese also has a series of nasalized vowels. Cruz-Ferreira (1995) analyzes European Portuguese with five monophthongs and five diphthongs, all phonemic: /ĩ ẽ ɐ̃ õ ũ ɐ̃j̃ õj̃ ũj̃ ɐ̃w̃ õw̃/. Nasal diphthongs occur mostly at the end of words (or followed by a final sibilant), and in a few compounds.

As in French, the nasal consonants represented by the letters ⟨m n⟩ are deleted in coda position, and in that case the preceding vowel becomes phonemically nasal, e.g. in genro /ˈʒẽʁu/ ('son-in-law'). But a nasal consonant subsists when it is followed by a plosive, e.g. in cantar [kɐ̃nˈtaɾ] ('to sing'). Vowel nasalization has also been observed non-phonemically as result of coarticulation, before heterosyllabic nasal consonants, e.g. in soma [ˈsõmɐ] ('sum'). Hence, there is a difference between phonemic nasal vowels and those that are allophonically nasalized. Additionally, a nasal monophthong /ɐ̃/ written ⟨ã⟩ exists independently of these processes, e.g. in romã /ʁoˈmɐ̃/ ('pomegranate'). Brazilian Portuguese is seen as being more nasal than European Portuguese due to the presence of these nasalized vowels. Some linguists consider them to be a result of external influences, including the common language spoken at Brazil's coast at time of the European arrival, Tupi.

The /e-ɛ/ and /o-ɔ/ distinction does not exist for nasal vowels; ⟨em om⟩ are pronounced as close-mid. In BP, the vowel /a/ (which the letter ⟨a⟩ otherwise represents) is sometimes phonemically raised to /ɐ/ when it is nasal, and also in stressed syllables before heterosyllabic nasal consonants (even if the speaker does not nasalize vowels in this position): compare for instance dama sã [ˈdɐmɐ ˈsɐ̃] (PT) or [ˈdɐ̃mɐ ˈsɐ̃] (BR) ('healthy lady') and dá maçã [ˈda mɐˈsɐ̃] (PT) or [ˈda maˈsɐ̃] (BR) ('it gives apples'). /a/ may also be raised slightly in word-final unstressed syllables.

Nasalization and height increase noticeably with time during the production of a single nasal vowel in BP in those cases that are written with nasal consonants ⟨m n⟩, so that /ˈʒẽʁu/ may be realized as [ˈʒẽɲʁu] or [ˈʒẽŋʁu]. This creates a significant difference between the realizations of ⟨am⟩ and ⟨ã⟩ for some speakers: compare for instance ranço real [ˈʁɐ̃su ˈʁjal] (PT) or [ˈʁɐ̃ɰ̃su ʁeˈaw] (BR) ('royal rancidness') and rã surreal [ˈʁɐ̃ suˈʁjal] (PT) or [ˈʁɐ̃ suʁeˈaw] (BR) ('surreal frog'). At the end of a word ⟨em⟩ is always pronounced [ẽj̃] with a clear nasal palatal approximant (see below). Whenever a nasal vowel is pronounced with a nasal coda (approximant or occlusive) the (phonetic) nasalization of the vowel itself is optional.

The following examples exhaustively demonstrate the general situation for BP.

- romã ('pomegranate') : [ʁoˈmɐ̃] : final vowel is (phonemically) "nasal" and nasalized approximants may not be pronounced.
- genro ('son-in-law') : [ˈʒẽʁu] or [ˈʒẽj̃ʁu] or [ˈʒẽɰ̃ʁu] : nasal consonant deleted; preceding vowel is (phonemically) "nasal" and nasalized approximants may be pronounced.
- cem ('a hundred') : [ˈsẽj̃] : nasalized approximant must be pronounced.
- cantar ('to sing') : [kɐ̃nˈtaɾ]: nasal consonant remains because of the following plosive; preceding vowel is raised and nasalized non-phonemically. (This is traditionally considered a "nasal" vowel by textbooks.)
- cano ('pipe') : [ˈkɐ̃nu] or [ˈkɐnu] : first vowel is necessarily raised, and may be nasalized non-phonemically.
- tomo ('I take') : [ˈtomu] or [ˈtõmu] : first vowel may be nasalized non-phonemically.

It follows from these observations that the vowels of BP can be described simply in the following way.

- BP has eight monophthongs—/a ɐ e ɛ i o ɔ u/—whose phonetic realizations may be affected by a nasal archiphoneme /N/. The vowel /ɐ/ is typically nasalized (in every position), but this is not phonemic.
- All eight vowels are differentiated in stressed and unstressed positions. But in word-final unstressed position and not followed by /N/, they reduce to three vowels—/a i u/—in most dialects. In this position, /a/ has a free variation [ɐ] and this fatally impairs /a-ɐ/ distinction. (For instance: the word ímã ('magnet') is effectively pronounced as either ima or ímam, depending on speaker.)
- Like the ん of Japanese, the archiphoneme /N/ is a nasal archiphoneme of syllabic codas and its actual place of articulation is determined by the following sound:
  - /VNp, VNb/=[Ṽmp, Ṽmb];
  - /VNt, VNd/=[Ṽnt, Ṽnd];
  - /VNk, VNg/=[Ṽŋk, Ṽŋg];
  - otherwise it becomes a nasalized approximant [ɰ̃] (as in Japanese kan'i 簡易 [かんい], etc.). After the vowels /e i/ this approximant may also be pronounced as [j̃]; and after /o u/ as [w̃] (free variations).
- The system of eight monophthongs reduces to five—/ɐ e i o u/—before /N/ and also in stressed syllables before heterosyllabic nasal consonants. The grapheme ⟨a⟩ stands for /ɐ/ in these cases.
- /eN/ is not allowed at word-final position because ⟨em⟩ stands for /ẽj/ in this case. (Here /j̃/ means the same phoneme that ⟨nh⟩ represents; and /e/ may be nasalized non-phonemically.) This is the only case of /j̃/ in coda-position.

With this description, the examples from before are simply /ʁoˈmɐ/, /ˈʒeNʁu/, /sej̃/, /kaNˈtaɾ/, /ˈkɐnu/, /ˈtomu/. Note that the aforementioned description may only apply to Southern-Southeastern dialects of Brazilian Portuguese. But there is no commonly accepted transcription for Brazilian Portuguese phonology.

Vowel nasalization in some dialects of Brazilian Portuguese is very different from that of French, for example. In French, the nasalization extends uniformly through the entire vowel, whereas in the Southern-Southeastern dialects of Brazilian Portuguese, the nasalization begins almost imperceptibly and then becomes stronger toward the end of the vowel. In this respect it is more similar to the nasalization of Hindi-Urdu (see Anusvara). In some cases, the nasal archiphoneme even entails the insertion of a nasal consonant such as [m, n, ŋ, ȷ̃, w̃, ɰ̃] (compare Polish phonology § Open), as in the following examples:

- banco [ˈbɐ̃ku ~ ˈbɐ̃ŋku ~ ˈbɐ̃ɰ̃ku]
- tempo [ˈtẽpu ~ ˈtẽmpu ~ ˈtẽȷ̃pu ~ ˈtẽɰ̃pu]
- pinta [ˈpĩtɐ ~ ˈpĩntɐ ~ ˈpĩȷ̃tɐ ~ ˈpĩɰ̃tɐ]
- sombra [ˈsõbɾɐ ~ ˈsõmbɾɐ ~ ˈsõw̃bɾɐ ~ ˈsõɰ̃bɾɐ]
- mundo [ˈmũdu ~ ˈmũndu ~ ˈmũw̃du ~ ˈmũɰ̃du]
- fã [ˈfɐ̃ ~ ˈfɐ̃ŋ ~ ˈfɐ̃ɰ̃]
- falam [ˈfalɐ̃w̃]
- bem [ˈbẽȷ̃ ~ ˈbẽĩ̠̯ɰ̃ ~ ˈbẽɰ̃]
- vim [ˈvĩ ~ ˈvĩĩ̠̯ɰ̃ ~ ˈvĩŋ ~ ˈvĩj̃ ~ ˈvĩɰ̃]
- bom [ˈbõ ~ ˈbõw̃ ~ ˈbõɰ̃ ~ ˈbõŋ]
- um [ˈũ ~ ˈũŋ ~ ˈũw̃ ~ ˈũɰ̃]
- mãe [ˈmɐ̃ȷ̃]
- pão [ˈpɐ̃w̃]
- põe [ˈpõȷ̃]
- muito [ˈmũj̃tu ~ ˈmũj̃ntu]

=== Nasal diphthongs ===
Nasal diphthong	Usual spelling	Example	Meaning	Notes and variants
/ɐ̃w̃/	**am**, **ão**	falam mão	'they speak' 'hand'	The spelling am is used in unstressed syllables (falaram [fɐˈlaɾɐ̃w̃], 'they spoke'), whereas ão is for stressed syllables (falarão [fɐlɐˈɾɐ̃w̃], 'they will speak')
/ɐ̃j̃/	**ãe**, **ãi**	mãe cãibra	'mom' 'cramp'	
/ẽj̃/	**em**	bem	'well'	In Central Portugal, it merges to [ɐ̃j], which means mãe and bem rhyme.
/õw̃ ~ õ/	**om**	bom	'good'	The diphthongization of such nasal vowel is controversial.
/õj̃/	**õe**	põe	'(he/she) puts'	
/ũj̃/	**ui**	muito	'very' 'much'	Only nasalized in words derived from muito (including mui).

Most times nasal diphthongs occur at the end of the word. They are:

- -ãe [ɐ̃j̃]. It occurs in mãe(s) ('mother[s]') and in the plural of some words ending in -ão, e.g., cães ('dogs'), pães ('breads'); and exceptionally non-finally in cãibra ('cramp'). In Central European Portuguese, it occurs also in all words ending in -em, like tem ('he/she/it has'), bem ('well', 'good', as a noun), mentem (they lie), etc.
- -em [ẽj̃]. It occurs, both stressed and unstressed, in Brazilian Portuguese and in European Portuguese (both northern and southern) in word-final syllables ending in -em or -ém, like bem, sem, and além, as well as in verbs ending in -em (the 3rd person plural present indicative of verbs whose infinitives end in -er or -ir). In Greater Lisbon, [ẽj̃] has merged with [ɐ̃j̃]; and it occurs duplicated in têm [ˈtẽj̃ẽj̃] or [ˈtɐ̃j̃ɐ̃j̃] (3rd person plural present indicative of ter, originally tẽem), which in Brazilian is homophonous with tem (the 3rd person singular).
- -õe [õj̃]. It occurs:
  - in the present indicative of pôr and its derivatives; in the 2nd person singular (pões [põj̃s], opões, compões, pressupões), in the 3rd person singular (põe [põj̃], opõe etc.), and non-finally in the 3rd person plural (põem [ˈpõẽj̃ ~ ˈpõj̃ẽj̃ ~ ˈpõj̃], opõem etc.).
  - in the plural of many words ending in-ão, e.g., limões ('lemons'), anões ('dwarfs'), espiões ('spies'), iões ('ions'), catiões ('cations'), aniões ('anions'), eletrões ('electrons'), neutrões ('neutrons'), protões ('protons'), fotões ('photons'), positrões ('positrons') and the plurals of all words with the suffix -ção (compare English -tion, like in communication), like comunicações ('communications'), provocações ('provocations').
- -uim or -uin [w̃ĩ] Example: pinguim ('penguin').
- ui [ũj̃] occurs only in the words muito [ˈmũj̃tu] and the uncommon mui [mũj̃]. The nasalisation here may be interpreted as allophonic, bleeding over from the previous m (compare mãe with the same bleeding of nasality).
- -ão or -am. [ɐ̃w̃]. Examples: pão ('bread'), cão ('dog'), estão ('they are'), vão ('they go'), limão ('lemon'), órgão ('organ'), Estêvão ('Steven'). When in the -am form (unstressed) they are always the 3rd person of the plural of a verb, like estavam ('they were'), contam ('they account'), escreveram ('they wrote'), partiram ('they left').
- -om [õw̃]. It occurs in word-final syllables ending in -om like bom and som. However, it may be also monophthongized to [õ].

[j̃] and [w̃] are nasalized, non-syllabic counterparts of the vowels /i/ and /u/, respectively. In European Portuguese, they are normally not fully close, being closer to [ɪ̯̃ ʊ̯̃]. As with the oral [ʊ̯], the nasal [ʊ̯̃] is not only more central but also more weakly rounded than the [u] monophthong. This is not transcribed in this article.

=== Vowel alternation ===
The stressed relatively open vowels /a, ɛ, ɔ/ contrast with the stressed relatively close vowels /ɐ, e, o/ in several kinds of grammatically meaningful alternation:

- Between the base form of a noun or adjective and its inflected forms: ovo /o/ ('egg'), ovos /ɔ/ ('eggs'); novo /o/, nova /ɔ/, novos /ɔ/, novas /ɔ/ ('new': masculine singular, feminine singular, masculine plural, feminine plural);
- Between some nouns or adjectives and related verb forms: adj. seco /e/ ('dry'), v. seco /ɛ/ ('I dry'); n. gosto /o/ ('taste'), v. gosto /ɔ/ ('I like'); n. governo /e/ ('government') v. governo /ɛ/ ('I govern');
- Between different forms of some verbs: pôde /o/ ('he could'), pode /ɔ/ ('he can');
- Between some pairs of related words: avô /o/ ('grandfather'), avó /ɔ/ ('grandmother');
- In regular verbs, the stressed vowel is normally low /a, ɛ, ɔ/, but high /ɐ, e, o/ before the nasal consonants /m/, /n/, /ɲ/ (the high vowels are also nasalized, in BP);
- Some stem-changing verbs alternate stressed high vowels with stressed low vowels in the present tense, according to a regular pattern: cedo, cedes, cede, cedem /e-ɛ-ɛ-ɛ/; movo, moves, move, movem /o-ɔ-ɔ-ɔ/ (present indicative); ceda, cedas, ceda, cedam /e/; mova, movas, mova, movam /o/ (present subjunctive). (There is another class of stem-changing verbs which alternate /i, u/ with /ɛ, ɔ/ according to the same scheme);
- In central Portugal, the 1st. person plural of verbs of the 1st. conjugation (with infinitives in -ar) has the stressed vowel /ɐ/ in the present indicative, but /a/ in the preterite, cf. pensamos ('we think') with pensámos ('we thought'). In BP, the stressed vowel is /ɐ̃/ in both, so they are written without accent mark.

There are also pairs of unrelated words that differ in the height of these vowels, such as besta /e/ ('beast') and besta /ɛ/ ('crossbow'); mexo /e/ ('I move') and mecho /ɛ/ ('I highlight [hair]'); molho /o/ ('sauce') and molho /ɔ/ ('bunch'); corte /ɔ/ ('cut') and corte /o/ ('court'); meta /e/ ('I put' subjunctive) and meta /ɛ/ ('goal'); and (especially in Portugal) para /ɐ/ ('for') and para /a/ ('he stops'); forma /o/ ('mold') and forma /ɔ/ ('shape').

There are several minimal pairs in which a clitic containing the vowel /ɐ/ contrasts with a monosyllabic stressed word containing /a/: da vs. dá, mas vs. más, a vs. à /a/, etc. In BP, however, these words may be pronounced with /a/ in some environments.

==== Unstressed vowels ====
Some isolated vowels (meaning those that are neither nasal nor part of a diphthong) tend to change quality in a fairly predictable way when they become unstressed. In the examples below, the stressed syllable of each word is in boldface. The term "final" should be interpreted here as at the end of a word or before word-final -s.

Spelling	Stressed		Unstressed, not final		Unstressed and final	
a	/a/ or /ɐ/ (BR, EP) /a/ (AP)	p**a**rto /a/ pens**a**mos /ɐ/ (BR, EP); /a/ (AP)	/ɐ/ or /a/ (EP) /a/ (AP, BP)	p**a**rtir /a/ (BR, AP); /ɐ/ (EP) **a**ção /a/	/ɐ/	pens**a** /ɐ/
ai	/aj/ or /aj ~ ɐj/ (BR) /aj/ (EP, AP)	p**ai** /aj/ pl**ai**na /aj ~ ɐj/ (BR); /aj/ (EP, AP)	/aj/ (BR, AP) /ɐj/ (EP)	ap**ai**xonar /aj/ (BR, AP); /ɐj/ (EP)	–	–
au	/aw/ or /aw ~ ɐw/ (BR) /aw/ (EP, AP)	p**au** /aw/ f**au**na /aw ~ ɐw/ (BR); /aw/ (EP, AP)	/aw/ (BR, AP) /ɐw/ (EP)	**sau**dade /aw/ (BR, AP); /ɐw/ (EP)	–	–
e	/e/ or /ɛ/	mov**e**r /e/ p**e**ga /ɛ/	/e/ (BR) /ɨ/ or /ɛ/ (EP) /e/ or /ɛ/ (AP)	pr**e**gar /e/ (BP, AP); /ɨ/ (EP) (to nail) pr**e**gar /e/ (BP); /ɛ/ (EP, AP) (to preach, to advocate)	/i/ (BR) /ɨ/ (EP, AP)	mov**e** /i/ (BP); /ɨ/ (EP, AP)
ei	/ej ~ e/ or /ɛj/ /ɐj/ (Lisbon)	p**ei**xe /ej ~ e/; /ɐj/ (Lisbon) an**éi**s /ɛj/; /ɐj/ (Lisbon)	/ej ~ e/ /ɐj/ (Lisbon)	el**ei**ção /ej/; /ɐj/ (Lisbon)	/ej ~ e/ /ɐj/ (Lisbon)	possív**ei**s /ej/; /ɐj/ (Lisbon)
eu	/ew/ or /ɛw/	m**eu** /ew/ c**éu** /ɛw/	/ew/	**eu**ropeu /ew/	–	–
o	/o/ or /ɔ/	p**ô**de /o/ p**o**de /ɔ/	/o/ (BP) /u/ or /ɔ/ (EP) /o/ or /ɔ/ (AP)	p**o**der /o/ (BP, AP); /u/ (EP) v**o**cê /o/ (BP); /ɔ/ (EP, AP)	/u/	pat**o** /u/
oi	/oj/ or /ɔj/	c**oi**sa /oj/ d**ói** /ɔj/	/oj/	**oi**tavo /oj/	–	–
ou	/ow ~ o/	**ou**ro /ow ~ o/	/ow ~ o/	d**ou**rado /ow ~ o/	–	–

With a few exceptions mentioned in the previous sections, the vowels /a/ and /ɐ/ occur in complementary distribution when stressed, the latter before nasal consonants followed by a vowel, and the former elsewhere.

In Brazilian Portuguese, the general pattern in the southern and western accents is that the stressed vowels /a, ɐ/, /e, ɛ/, /o, ɔ/ neutralize to /a/, /e/, /o/, respectively, in unstressed syllables, as is common in Romance languages. In final unstressed syllables, however, they are raised to /ɐ/, /i/, /u/. In casual BP (as well as in the fluminense dialect), unstressed /e/ and /o/ may be raised to /i/, /u/ on any unstressed syllable, as long as it has no coda. However, in the dialects of Northeastern Brazilian (as spoken in the states of Bahia and Pernambuco), non-final unstressed vowels are often open-mid /a/, /ɛ/, /ɔ/, independent of vowel harmony with surrounding lower vowels.

European Portuguese has taken this process one step further, raising /a, ɐ/, /e, ɛ/, /o, ɔ/ to /ɐ/, /ɨ/, /u/ in almost all unstressed syllables. The vowels /ɐ/ and /ɨ/ are also more centralized than their Brazilian counterparts. The three unstressed vowels /ɐ, ɨ, u/ are reduced and often voiceless or elided in fast speech.

However, Angolan Portuguese has been more conservative, raising /a/, /e, ɛ/, /o, ɔ/ to /a/, /e/, /o/ in unstressed syllables; and to /ɐ/, /ɨ/, /u/ in final unstressed syllables. Which makes it almost similar to Brazilian Portuguese (except by final /ɨ/, which is inherited from European Portuguese).

There are some exceptions to the rules above. For example, /i/ occurs instead of unstressed /e/ or /ɨ/, word-initially or before another vowel in hiatus (teatro, reúne, peão). /ɨ/ is often deleted entirely word-initially in the combination /ɨsC/ becoming [ʃC ~ ʒC]. Also, /a/, /ɛ/ or /ɔ/ appear in some unstressed syllables in EP, being marked in the lexicon, like espetáculo (spectacle) [ʃpɛˈtakulu]; these occur from deletion of the final consonant in a closed syllable and from crasis. And there is some dialectal variation in the unstressed sounds: the northern and eastern accents of BP have low vowels in unstressed syllables, /ɛ, ɔ/, instead of the high vowels /e, o/. However, the Brazilian media tends to prefer the southern pronunciation. In any event, the general paradigm is a useful guide for pronunciation and spelling.

Nasal vowels, vowels that belong to falling diphthongs, and the high vowels /i/ and /u/ are not affected by this process, nor is the vowel /o/ when written as the digraph ⟨ou⟩ (pronounced /ow/ in conservative EP).

==== Further notes on the oral vowels ====
- Some words with /ɛ ɔ/ in EP have /e o/ in BP. This happens when those vowels are stressed before the nasal consonants /m/, /n/, followed by another vowel, in which case both types may occur in European Portuguese, but Brazilian Portuguese for the most part allows only mid or close-mid vowels. This can affect spelling: cf. EP tónico, BP tônico "tonic".
- In most BP, stressed vowels have nasal allophones, [ɐ̃], [ẽ], [ĩ], [õ], [ũ], etc. (see below) before one of the nasal consonants /m/, /n/, /ɲ/, followed by another vowel. In São Paulo, Southern Brazil, and EP, nasalization is nearly absent in this environment, other than in compounds such as connosco, comummente (spelled conosco, comumente in BP).
- Most BP speakers also diphthongize stressed vowels in oxytones to [aj], [ɛj], [ej], [oj], [ɔj], [uj], etc. (sometimes /ij/), before a sibilant coda (written s or z). For instance, Jesus [ʒeˈzujs] ('Jesus'), faz [fajs] ('he does'), dez [dɛjs] ('ten'). This has led to the use of meia (from meia dúzia 'half a dozen") instead of seis [sejs] ('six') when making enumerations, to avoid any confusion with três [tɾejs] ('three') on the telephone.
- In Greater Lisbon, /e/ is pronounced [ɐ(j)] when it comes before a palatal consonant /j/, /ʎ/, /ɲ/ or a palato-alveolar /ʃ/, /ʒ/, followed by another vowel; also, [ẽj̃] is pronounced [ɐ̃j̃].

== Sandhi ==
When two words belonging to the same phrase are pronounced together, or two morphemes are joined in a word, the last sound in the first may be affected by the first sound of the next (sandhi), either coalescing with it, or becoming shorter (a semivowel), or being deleted. This affects especially the sibilant consonants /s/, /z/, /ʃ/, /ʒ/, and the unstressed final vowels /ɐ/, /i, ɨ/, /u/.

=== Consonant sandhi ===
As was mentioned above, the dialects of Portuguese can be divided into two groups, according to whether syllable-final sibilants are pronounced as postalveolar consonants /ʃ/, /ʒ/ or as alveolar /s/, /z/. At the end of words, the default pronunciation for a sibilant is voiceless, /ʃ, s/, but in connected speech the sibilant is treated as though it were within a word (assimilation):

- If the next word begins with a voiceless consonant, the final sibilant remains voiceless /s, ʃ/; bons tempos [bõʃ ˈtẽpuʃ] or [bõs ˈtẽpus] ('good times').
- If the next word begins with a voiced consonant, the final sibilant becomes voiced as well /z, ʒ/; bons dias [bõʒ ˈdiɐʃ] or [bõz ˈdʒiɐs] ('good days').
- If the next word begins with a vowel, the final sibilant is treated as intervocalic, and pronounced [z]; bons amigos [bõz ɐˈmiɣuʃ] or [bõz aˈmiɡus] ('good friends').

When two identical sibilants appear in sequence within a word, they reduce to a single consonant. For example, nascer, desço, excesso, exsudar are pronounced with [s] by speakers who use alveolar sibilants at the end of syllables, and disjuntor is pronounced with [ʒ] by speakers who use postalveolars. But if the two sibilants are different they may be pronounced separately, depending on the dialect. Thus, the former speakers will pronounce the last example with [zʒ], whereas the latter speakers will pronounce the first examples with [s] if they are from Brazil or [ʃs] if from Portugal (although in relaxed pronunciation one of the siblants may be dropped). This applies also to words that are pronounced together in connected speech:

- sibilant + /s/, e.g., as sopas: either [s] (most of Brazil); [ʃs] (Portugal, standard)
- sibilant + /z/, e.g., as zonas: either [z] (mostly in Brazil); [ʒz] (Portugal, standard)
- sibilant + /ʃ/, e.g., as chaves: always [ʃ];
- sibilant + /ʒ/, e.g., os genes: always [ʒ].

=== Vowel sandhi ===
Normally, only the three vowels /ɐ/, /i/ (in BP) or /ɨ/ (in EP), and /u/ occur in unstressed final position. If the next word begins with a similar vowel, they merge with it in connected speech, producing a single vowel, possibly long (crasis). Here, "similar" means that nasalization can be disregarded, and that the two central vowels /a, ɐ/ can be identified with each other. Thus,

- /aa, aɐ, ɐa, ɐɐ/ → [a(ː)] (henceforth transcribed [a (a)]); toda a noite [ˈtoða (a) ˈnojtɨ] or [ˈtoda (a) ˈnojtʃi] ('all night'), nessa altura [ˈnɛs awˈtuɾɐ] or [ˈnɛs alˈtuɾɐ] ('at that point').
- /aɐ̃, ɐɐ̃/ → [ã(ː)]) (henceforth transcribed [ã (ã)]); a antiga ('the ancient one') and à antiga ('in the ancient way'), both pronounced [ã (ã)ˈtʃiɡɐ] or [ã (ã)ˈtiɣɐ]. The open nasalized [ã] appears only in this environment.
- /ii, iĩ/ → [i(ː), ĩ(ː)] (henceforth transcribed [i (i), ĩ (ĩ)]); de idade [dʒi (i)ˈdadʒi] or [di (i)ˈðaðɨ] ('aged').
- /ɨɨ/ → [ɨ]; fila de espera [ˈfilɐ ðɨʃˈpɛɾɐ] ('waiting line') (EP only).
- /uu, uũ/ → [u(ː), ũ(ː)] (henceforth transcribed [u (u), ũ (ũ)]); todo o dia [ˈtodu (u) ˈdʒiɐ] or [ˈtoðu (u) ˈðiɐ] ('all day').

If the next word begins with a dissimilar vowel, then /i/ and /u/ become approximants in Brazilian Portuguese (synaeresis):

- /i/ + V → [jV]; durante o curso [duˈɾɐ̃tʃju ˈkuɾsu] ('during the course'), mais que um [majs kjũ] ('more than one').
- /u/ + V → [wV]; todo este tempo [ˈtoˈdwestʃi ˈtẽpu] ('all this time') do objeto [dwobiˈʒɛtu] ('of the object').

In careful speech and in with certain function words, or in some phrase stress conditions (see Mateus and d'Andrade, for details), European Portuguese has a similar process:

- /ɨ/ + V → [jV]; se a vires [sjɐ ˈviɾɨʃ] ('if you see her'), mais que um [majʃ kjũ] ('more than one').
- /u/ + V → [wV]; todo este tempo [ˈtoˈðweʃtɨ ˈtẽpu] ('all this time'), do objeto [dwɔbˈʒɛtu] ('of the object').

But in other prosodic conditions, and in relaxed pronunciation, EP simply drops final unstressed /ɨ/ and /u/ (elision), though this is subject to significant dialectal variation:

- durante o curso [duˈɾɐ̃tu ˈkuɾsu] ('during the course'), este inquilino [ˈeʃtĩkɨˈlinu] ('this tenant').
- todo este tempo [toˈðeʃtɨ ˈtẽpu] ('all this time'), disto há muito [diʃta ˈmũjtu] ('there's a lot of this').

Aside from historical set contractions formed by prepositions plus determiners or pronouns, like à/dà, ao/do, nesse, dele, etc., on one hand and combined clitic pronouns such as mo/ma/mos/mas (it/him/her/them to/for me), and so on, on the other, Portuguese spelling does not reflect vowel sandhi. In poetry, however, an apostrophe may be used to show elision such as in d'água.

== Stress ==
Primary stress may fall on any of the three final syllables of a word, but most commonly on the last two, as antepenultimate stress is relatively less frequent in the language. There is a partial correlation between the position of the stress and the final vowel; for example, the final syllable is usually stressed when it contains a nasal phoneme, a diphthong, or a close vowel—this is especially relevant given the influence of Indigenous languages in Brazil, as indigenous words often have final stress: urubu 'vulture', açaí 'açai', both of which originate from Tupi and have final stress. The orthography of Portuguese takes advantage of this correlation to minimize the number of diacritics, but orthographic rules vary in different regions (e.g., Brazil and Portugal), and should not be used as a reliable guide to stress, despite the existing correlations found in the grapheme-phoneme conversion of Portuguese data.

As in English, stress in verbs and non-verbs is computed differently. For verbs, stress is deterministic, as different morphemes determine the location of stress in a given word based on tense, mood, person and number. For this reason, the few examples one can find of minimal pairs of lexical stress involve either different verb forms for a given stem, such as ruíram /ʁuˈiɾɐ̃w̃/ 'they collapsed' vs. ruirão /ʁuiˈɾɐ̃w̃/ 'they will collapse', or a noun-verb pair, such as dúvida /ˈduvidɐ/ 'doubt' vs. duvida /duˈvidɐ/ 's/he doubts'. For example, regardless of which verb one considers, stress is always final for the first person singular in the future simple tense (indicative): (eu) falarei 'I will speak'. For nouns and adjectives (i.e., non-verbs), stress is mostly affected by phonological factors such as syllable weight, although morphology also plays a role, as different suffixes may affect the location of stress in a given word. In simple terms, the algorithm for stress in non-verbs is similar to that of English and Latin (modulo the extrametricality of the final syllable, which is absent in Portuguese): stress is final if the final syllable is heavy and penultimate otherwise. A heavy syllable contains a diphthong or a coda consonant. All other patterns are considered to be irregular in most approaches in the literature, even though subregularities have been determined and discussed in recent studies. Finally, syllable weight has also been shown to affect the position of secondary stress in the language, whose location can vary in words with an odd number of pre-tonic syllables. In such words, there's some experimental evidence showing that the presence of a given syllable containing a coda leads to a preference for secondary stress in said syllable.

== Prosody ==
Tone is not lexically significant in Portuguese, but phrase- and sentence-level tones are important. As in most Romance languages, interrogation on yes–no questions is expressed mainly by sharply raising the tone at the end of the sentence. An exception to this is the word oi that is subject to meaning changes: an exclamation tone means 'hi/hello', and in an interrogative tone it means 'I didn't understand'.

As for prosodic domains, the presence of metrical feet in Portuguese has been called into question in a recent study, which argues that no strong evidence exists in the language that supports this particular domain (at least Brazilian Portuguese)—despite the presence of stress and secondary stress, both of which are typically (albeit not always) associated with feet.

== See also ==
- Differences between Spanish and Portuguese
- History of Portuguese
- Portuguese orthography
- Portuguese dialects

== Bibliography ==
- Barbosa, Plínio A.; Albano, Eleonora C. (2004), "Brazilian Portuguese" (PDF), Journal of the International Phonetic Association, 34 (2): 227–232, doi:10.1017/S0025100304001756
- Bisol, Leda (2005), Introdução a estudos de fonologia do português brasileiro [Introduction to Brazilian Portuguese phonology studies] (in Portuguese), Porto Alegre – Rio Grande do Sul: EDIPUCRS, ISBN 85-7430-529-4
- Bonet, Eulàlia; Mascaró, Joan (1997), "On the representation of contrasting rhotics" (PDF), in Martínez-Gil, Fernando; Morales-Front, Alfonso (eds.), Issues in the Phonology and Morphology of the Major Iberian Languages, Georgetown University Press, pp. 103–126
- Callou, Dinah; Leite, Yonne (1990), Iniciação à fonética e à fonologia [Introduction to phonetics and phonology] (in Portuguese), Rio de Janeiro: Jorge Zahar, ISBN 85-7110-096-9
- Câmara, Joaquim Mattoso Jr. (1953), Para o Estudo da Fonémica Portuguesa [For the study of Portuguese phonemics] (in Portuguese), Rio de Janeiro: Organização Simões
- Cristófaro Silva, Thaïs (2024), "Current issues in Portuguese Syllable Structure", in Zampaulo, André (ed.), The Routledge Handbook of Portuguese Phonology, London: Routledge, pp. 95–114, doi:10.4324/9781003266648-8, ISBN 978-1-003-26664-8
- Cruz-Ferreira, Madalena (1995), "European Portuguese", Journal of the International Phonetic Association, 25 (2): 90–94, doi:10.1017/S0025100300005223, S2CID 249414876
- Cruz-Ferreira, Madalena (1999). "Portuguese (European)". Handbook of the International Phonetic Association: A Guide to the Use of the International Phonetic Alphabet. Cambridge: Cambridge University Press. ISBN 978-0-521-63751-0.
- Cagliari, Luiz Carlos (1977), An Experimental Study of Nasality with Particular Reference to Brazilian Portuguese (thesis), University of Edinburgh, hdl:1842/17275
- Cuesta, Vázquez; da Luz, Mendes (1987), Gramática portuguesa [Portuguese grammar] (in Portuguese) (3rd ed.), Gredos, ISBN 84-249-1117-2
- D'Angelis, Wilmar da Rocha (2002), "Sistema Fonológico do Português: Rediscutindo o Consenso" [Portuguese phonological system: Rediscussing the consensus], DELTA (in Portuguese), 18 (1): 1–24, doi:10.1590/S0102-44502002000100001
- Emiliano, António (2009), Fonética do português europeu: descrição e transcrição, Guimarães Editores, ISBN 978-972-665-614-2
- Garcia, Guilherme D. (2017), Weight effects on stress: lexicon and grammar, PhD thesis, McGill University, Montréal, Canada.
- Garcia, Guilherme D. (2017), "Weight gradience and stress in Portuguese", Phonology, 34 (1), Cambridge University Press.: 41–79, doi:10.1017/S0952675717000033, hdl:20.500.11794/105123
- Garcia, Guilherme D. (2024), "Current issues in Portuguese main and secondary stress", in Zampaulo, André (ed.), The Routledge Handbook of Portuguese Phonology, London: Routledge, pp. 115–141, doi:10.4324/9781003266648-9, ISBN 978-1-003-26664-8
- Grønnum, Nina (2005), Fonetik og fonologi, Almen og Dansk (3rd ed.), Copenhagen: Akademisk Forlag, ISBN 87-500-3865-6
- Major, Roy C. (1992), "Stress and Rhythm in Brazilian Portuguese", in Koike, Dale April; Macedo, Donaldo P (eds.), Romance Linguistics: The Portuguese Context, vol. 61, Westport, CT: Bergin & Garvey, pp. 259–282, doi:10.2307/414145, ISBN 0-89789-297-6, JSTOR 414145
- Mateus, Maria Helena; d'Andrade, Ernesto (2000), The Phonology of Portuguese, Oxford University Press, ISBN 0-19-823581-X
- Perini, Mário Alberto (2002), Modern Portuguese (A Reference Grammar), New Haven: Yale University Press, ISBN 978-0-300-09155-7
- Rodrigues, Marisandra Costa (2012), Encontros Vocálicos Finais em Português: Descrição e Análise Otimalista [Final vowel encounters in Portuguese: Optimalistic description and analysis] (PDF) (thesis) (in Portuguese), Universidade Federal do Rio de Janeiro, archived from the original (PDF) on 2017-10-11
- Spahr, Christopher (2013), Confronting the European Portuguese low vowel distinction (PDF), Toronto: University of Toronto
- Undolo, Márcio (2014), "Caracterização do sistema vocálico do português culto falado em Angola" [Characterization of the vowel system of learned Portuguese spoken in Angola], Revista de Filologia Romanica (in Portuguese), 31 (2), Évora, Portugal: Universidade de Évora, Portugal: 181–187
- Thomas, Earl W. (1974), A Grammar of Spoken Brazilian Portuguese, Nashville, TN: Vanderbilt University Press, ISBN 0-8265-1197-X
- Veloso, João (2005), "Considerações Sobre o Estatuto Fonológico de [ɨ] em Português" [Considerations about the phonological status of [ɨ] in Portuguese] (PDF), Línguas e Literaturas, 2 (in Portuguese), vol. 22, Porto: Revista da Faculdade de Letras da Universidade do Porto, pp. 621–632
