= Caipira dialect =

Dialect of Brazilian Portuguese

Caipira
- Pronunciation: locally [kajˈpiɹ(ɐ)]
- Native to: Brazil
- Region: Paulistania: São Paulo; Mato Grosso; Mato Grosso do Sul; Goiás; Minas Gerais; Paraná; Rondônia
- Ethnicity: Caipiras
- Native speakers: c. 30 million (2022)
- Language family: Indo-European: Italic; Latino-Faliscan; Latin; Romance; Italo-Western; Western Romance; Gallo-Iberian; Iberian Romance; West Iberian; Galician–Portuguese; Portuguese; Brazilian Portuguese; Caipira

Language codes
- ISO 639-3: –
- Glottolog: None
- Linguasphere: 51-AAA-am
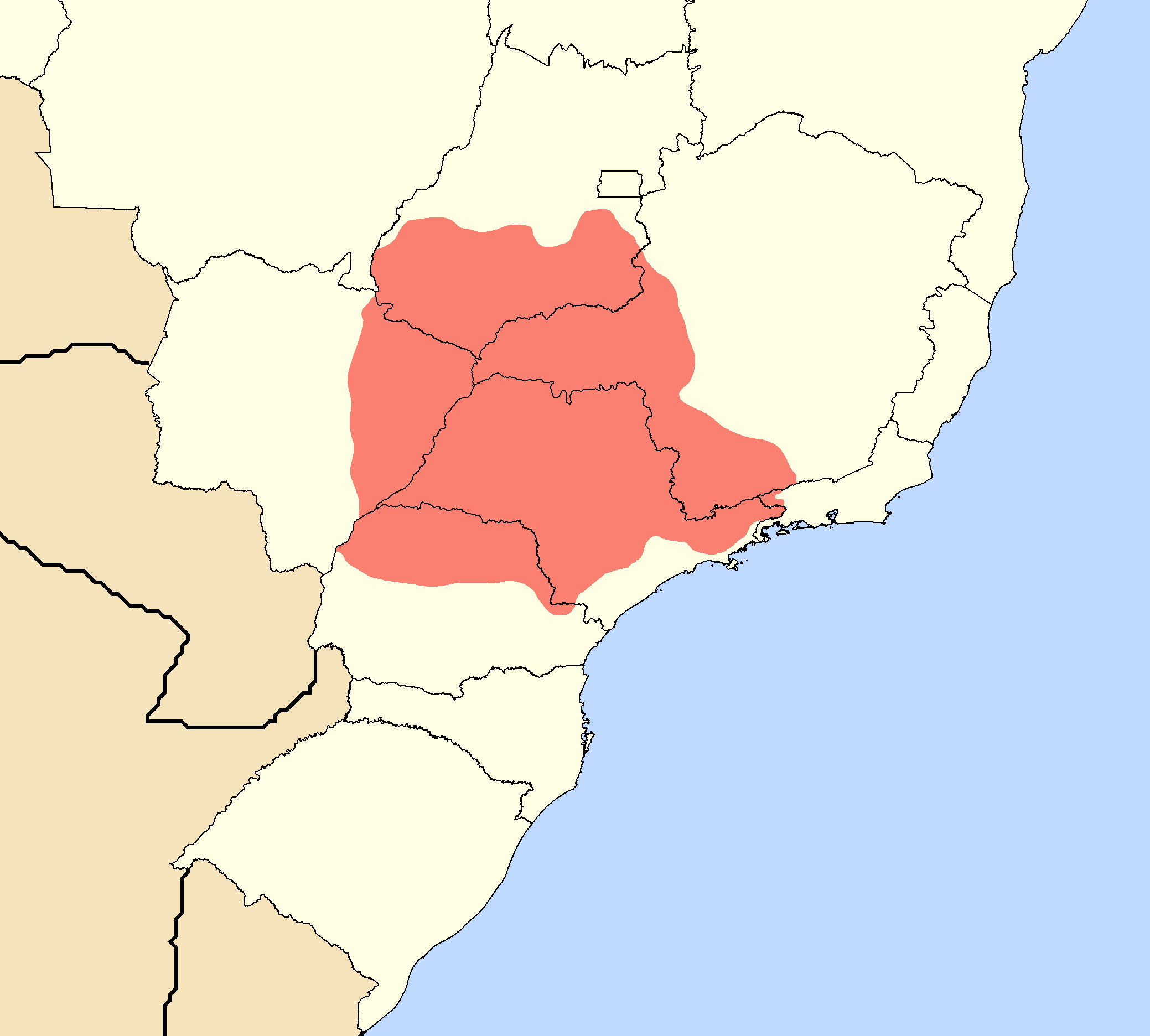
- Approximate range of the dialect over a map of the southern half of Brazil.

Caipira (Brazilian Portuguese: [kajˈpiɾɐ], Caipira pronunciation: [kajˈpiɹ(ɐ)]) is a dialect of the Portuguese language spoken in localities of Caipira influence, mainly in the interior of the state of São Paulo, in the eastern south of Mato Grosso do Sul, in the Triângulo and southern Minas Gerais, in the south of Goiás, in the far north, center and west of Paraná, as well as in other regions of the interior of the state. Its delimitation and characterization dates back to 1920, with Amadeu Amaral's work, O Dialecto Caipira.

== History ==
The formation of the caipira dialect began with the arrival of the Portuguese in São Vicente in the sixteenth century. Ongoing research points to several influences, such as Galician-Portuguese, represented in some archaic aspects of the dialect, and the língua geral paulista, a Tupian Portuguese-like creole codified by the Jesuits. The westward colonial expansion by the Bandeirantes expedition spread the dialect throughout a dialectal and cultural continuum called Paulistania in the provinces of São Paulo, Mato Grosso (later, Mato Grosso do Sul and Rondônia), Goiás, Federal District, and Minas Gerais.

In the 1920s, the scholar Amadeu Amaral published a grammar and predicted the imminent death of the caipira dialect, caused by urbanization and the coming wave of mass immigration resulting from the monoculture of coffee. However, the dialect survived in rural subculture, with music, folk stories (causos), and a substratum in city-dwellers' speech, recorded by folklorists and linguists, but some caipira variants were already heard by the 1790s to 1890s.

== Sociolinguistics ==
Although the caipira accent originated in the state of São Paulo, the middle- and upper-class sociolect of the state capital is now a very different variety, which is closer to Standard Portuguese but with some Italian-influenced elements, and working-class paulistanos may sound somewhat like caipira to people of other parts of Brazil, such as Bahia and Rio de Janeiro. Caipira is spoken mostly in the countryside

== Phonology ==
There may be some variation between speakers. The following is a description of various features of the dialect, which is sometimes said to have a significant number of particularities:

=== Rhoticism ===
Phonetically, the most important differences in comparison with standard Brazilian Portuguese are the postalveolar or retroflex approximants ([ɹ ~ ɻ]) for ⟨r⟩ as allophone of European and paulistano [r ~ ɹ] in the syllable coda (/ʁ/ in the syllable coda for most Brazilian dialects), as in most areas, there is a [u ~ ʊ] realization of coda ⟨l⟩, although not as in most area, it can also be pronounced as the coda ⟨r⟩ of it, [ɹ ~ ɻ]

The most common coda or allophones of caipira are not the same as those in urban areas of hinterland São Paulo and some speakers of the capital and the coast, who use the alveolar approximant [ɹ] or the r-colored vowel, which some speakers use instead.

=== /ʎ/ Iotization ===
As in Nordestino (the Northeastern) dialect, there is a merger of /ʎ/ ⟨lh⟩ into the semivowel /j/ although, unlike Nordestino, that cannot happen for its nasal equivalent and similar to but not exactly like yeísmo (/ʎ/ → [ʝ]) is a feature of Caipira, some may not merge /ʎ/ into [j] or may vocalize the ⟨l⟩. Rarer pronunciations include using approximants for all instances in which European speakers of Portuguese have [ɾ], including the intervocalic and post-consonantal ones (like in American English) or using a palatal approximant [j] instead of a rhotic approximant. That, while more common in the Caipira area by its particular phonology, is more often associated with speech-language pathology.

=== Lowering ===
The lowering of /i/ to [e] happens in some context in Caipira speech and so <país> "country" becomes realized as [päes] in Caipira. This can also happen with diphthongs and semi-vowels, /i j/ become [e] and /w u/ become [o].

=== Raising ===
This phenomenon happens in most dialects although not all (the Sulista and Paulista accents do not have this feature.)

In this dialect, it occurs in 'Vocalic Groups' (cães, areas, ... but not diphthongs like mais /aj/, leite /ej/) and in stressed vowels and the result of the heightening is [i] and [u]. Elision often happens in cases where it happens.

=== Diphthongization before specific consonants ===
Certain vowels start to glide to a [j] sound before coda <s> as in other dialects (this merges mas and mais, that difference may be confusing for someone that's why there's a significant amount of material explaining the differences between the two), this may be analyzed as adding a [j], this pronunciation, there are identified cases where this sort of shift happens before <n> in Caipira as in some idiolects of Paulistano, that is the dialect spoken casually in the urban regions of the southeast, this sort of realization was historically registered typically only in other vernaculars but that doesn't mean it doesn't occur in more educated speakers, those that know the standard but may do this in familiar, colloquial or informal registers of language

=== Elision of consonants ===
The elision of consonants frequently happens with /r/ ([pro] → [po]) in specific situations, which are different fromwhat may happen in dialects like Paulistano, whose final rhotics in infinitives of verbs may get removed, elision sometimes described, more informally in Portuguese as "comendo" (that usually passes the idea of consuming food) but also with vowels (the first <e> in <cadáveres> and <inspetor> may get deleted), there are reported cases of that happening in the 1840s, and a vowel before <nh> may not get realized

=== Epenthesis ===
Epenthesis may occur in which a vowel is added to break infrequent consonant clusters, as in some dialects, Caipira usually uses [e], but there are dialects that use a sound that is more like [i] (advogado → adevogado) but there are cases of rhotic epenthesis (debuta → debruta), sometimes it also happens because of hypercorrection, (inclusive → inclusivel), epenthesis also occurs more broadly in Brazilian Portuguese when borrowing a word in certain contexts.

=== Metathesis and other shifts in order ===
Metathesis is a process that happens in /p f/ + /r/ + /V/ sequences in which the rhotic + vowel position invert. It also happens in other situations like with the postposition <em> (which gets realized as [ni]), the rhotic may go to a different syllable (pedestres → pedrestes). This category of sound together with hypothesis change happens frequently with <r>, as noted by the linguist Amaral. It was sometimes found for a sound to take what had been the place of a similar sound (fétido → fedito).

=== Shifts in the nasalization property ===
Words may gain or lose nasalization ([NASAL+]) (ordenou → ordeou, economizar → enconomizar). The addition of nasalization may happen with /i/ and /e/ in initial position on their own. Word-final nasalization may be found (contagem → contage), which merges "fala" (third-person singular) with "falam" (third-person plural). It occurs in some representations like Chico Bento.

=== Shifts in voice to sometimes voicedness ===
Sounds may become voiced between voiced sounds (precisa → perciza). Even as early as the 1808, devoicing ([bt] → [pt]) happened.

=== Diphthongs becoming monophthongs ===
Unstressed /ow/, /aj/, /ej/, /õw/ and /ẽj/ may lose their semi-vowel, but monophthongization is in no way limited to caipira and may be observed in other varieties (that includes those in Portugal), the [ow] → [o], which results in the short version of the temporal copula <estou> being /to/ (<tô> or <to>) and not /tow/, the broad range of how much of Portugal is affected by the shift is from half to two thirds of Portugal, others like /ej/ → [e] and /aj/ → [a] also affect other regions.

== Examples ==
Caipira	Portuguese	Galician	English
Ocê, Mecê	Você, Tu	Ti, Te	You
Nóis, Nói	Nós	Nós	We
Hómi	Homem	Home	Man
Muié	Mulher	Muller	Woman
Ermão	Irmão	Irmán	Brother
Ansim	Assim	Así	Like this / So / Thus
Inté	Até	Ata, Até	Until / Even
Nhô	Senhor, Seu	Señor	Sir, Mr.
Sodade	Saudade	Saudade	Longing, Nostalgia
Musga	Música	Música	Music
Costeá	Castigar	Castigar	To punish
Çucre	Açúcar	Azucre	Sugar
Coresma	Quaresma	Coresma	Lent
Derde	Desde	Dende	Since
Despoi	Depois	Despois	After / Later
Estória	História	História	History / Story
Far, Fai	Faz	Fai	Does / Makes
Mea	Minha	Miña	My (feminine)
Véve	Vive	Vive	Live

== Morphology and syntax ==
=== Pronouns ===
- The usage of "cê" (happens in some) or "ocê" (the latter is used by Chico Bento) as the informal second-person singular pronoun, which is derived from "você", the pronoun that is used in most of Brazil.
- "Tu" is never used, including the one that has conjugation of "você," instead of its own (<Tu anda> vs <Tu andas>) like in most of the south and in the slang of the Carioca but unlike most of the northeast.
- "Vós" is never used and always replaced with "vocês" or "(o)cês," which is used in all of Brazil and most of Portugal.

=== Inflectional morphology ===
These inflectional morphologic changes have been observed. Some (possibly most) of them are not restricted to the caipira area and are formed through contractions.

Gains:

- Com + a = coa
- De + outra = D'outra or D'ôtra
- Para + dentro = padantu or padanto.
- Para + article = Pa\Po
- Negation word distingtion: Não [nɐ̃ʊ̯̃] in short replies, and num [nʊ̃] for negative phrases
- Pra\Para constracts with Ocê (you)
  - P(r) + ose = p(r)ose

Loss:

- Because of shifts in nasalization, pairs like 'falam' (third-person plural) and 'fala' (second- and third-person singular) merge.

Shift in usage

- As other vernacular varieties, if it is already clear something is in the plural, caipira may drop the plural ending: standard: essas coisas bonitas [ˈɛsɐsˈ koi̯zɐz bʊˈn̠ʲitɐs] "those beautiful things" (those-PL beautiful-PL thing-PL) \ um monte de livros (a lot\mountain-∅ in this case "lot" of book-PL) ↔ caipira and other venecular dialects: essas coisa bonita [ˈ(ɛ)sɐsˈ koi̯zɐ bʊˈn̠ʲitɐ] (those-PL beautiful-∅ thing-∅) \ um monte de livro (a lot\mountain-∅ in this case "lot" of book-∅) because the fact that there are many books implies that there is more than one. Sometimes, the lack of plurality in specific situations is thought of as being very typical of speakers of Paulistano.

Caipira is the Brazilian dialect that by far the most influenced by the línguas gerais, which is said to be a recent decreolization of them into a more standard Brazilian Portuguese. Nevertheless, the decreolization was successful, and despite all of the differences, a speaker of vernacular Brazilian Portuguese of other regions has no difficulty in understanding caipira, but foreigners who learned to deal only with standard Brazilian Portuguese may have as much difficulty with caipira as they would have with other colloquial and vernacular registers of the language.

== Lexicon ==
The words are extremely similar to those used in other venecular varieties in Brazil (ex: <fugaz> almost always not being used, <industria> shifting in meaning and some combinations like <já que> becoming grammatalized) but there are some expressions that are typically caipira, some of those are:

- Acabar no caritó meaning "to be not married"
- Chamego usually capturing things that are related to romance, but sometimes "noise"
- Boca-de-siri meaning "to be quiet"
- Biboca meaning "a house of a poor person", which is normally mentally associated with (Brazilian) stereotypes of those like being hidden, small, as well as other stereotypical ideas of those, it may also refer to a category of business
- Chorar o defunto meaning "to find death unacceptable", this term is prevalent in rural areas in general and not restricted to the more specific zone that Caipira is spoken in
- Dar cabo a machado meaning "to find problems where there aren't any"
- Emendar os bigodes meaning "doing talking extremely frequently" or more strictly doing this while not considering time
- Fazer renda meaning "waiting" that may exclusively signal "the action of waiting for a long period" like Chá de cadera, sometimes used to say that someone was in a chair and therefore not dancing for an entire party
- Pinguço meaning "drunk" as in the English sentence he is drunk but not the cup of water was drunk by her, as a result of slight semantic drift targeting this word, Pinguço meaning "drinking alcohol in an excessive quantity" like alcoólatra

== Orthographical pragmatic systems ==
There is no standard orthography, and Brazilians are taught only the standard variant when they learn Portuguese in schools, which is among the reasons that the dialect was often thought of as endangered in the course of socio-economic development of the country. A nonstandard orthography intended to convey caipira pronunciation is featured prominently in the popular children's comic book Chico Bento, in which some characters speak in it, the table below shows how it usually represents certain phonological aspects of the speech of the Caipira.

These systems may highlight pragmatic-sociolinguistic expectations not being followed in caipira like writing Cockney or any other exceedingly venecular speech differently.

=== Chico Bento ===
Non-standard Phonetic Alteration	Standard spelling	Informal Caipira
Iotization	"lh"	"i"
Heightening	"e" and "o"	"i" and "u"
Rhoticism	ø	"r"
Disalizing	Orthographic vowel with a tilde (i.e.: a vs ã, similar to the approximation symbol) ^{1}	Orthographic vowel and "m" or "n" and if a tilde is on top, it is removed
Reversion in order	Works in reference to how the standard and other varieties are realized	Reversion of typical orthographic sequence^{2}
Iotization before /s/	Vowel and "s"	Vowel and "is"
Monothongnization	"ou", "ei" and "ai"	"ô", "e" and "a"
Disrhoticism	"ar and "er"	"á" and "ê"

== See also ==
- Caipiras
- Paulistas
- Caipira culture
- Cafundó
- Brazilian Portuguese
- Portuguese dialects
- Portuguese phonology
- Mineiro
- Carioca
