= Sertanejo Portuguese =

Dialect of Brazilian Portuguese

- Dialeto Sertanejo
- Pronunciation: d͡ʒjɐˈlɛtu seɹtɐ̃ˈneʒu
- Native to: Brazil
- Region: Mato Grosso, Mato Grosso do Sul and Goiás
- Ethnicity: Caipiras
- Native speakers: c. 7 million (2022)
- Language family: Indo-European: Italic; Latin; Romance; Western; Ibero-Romance; West Iberian; Galician-Portuguese; Portuguese; Vernacular Brazilian; Sertanejo Portuguese

Language codes
- ISO 639-3: –
- Glottolog: None
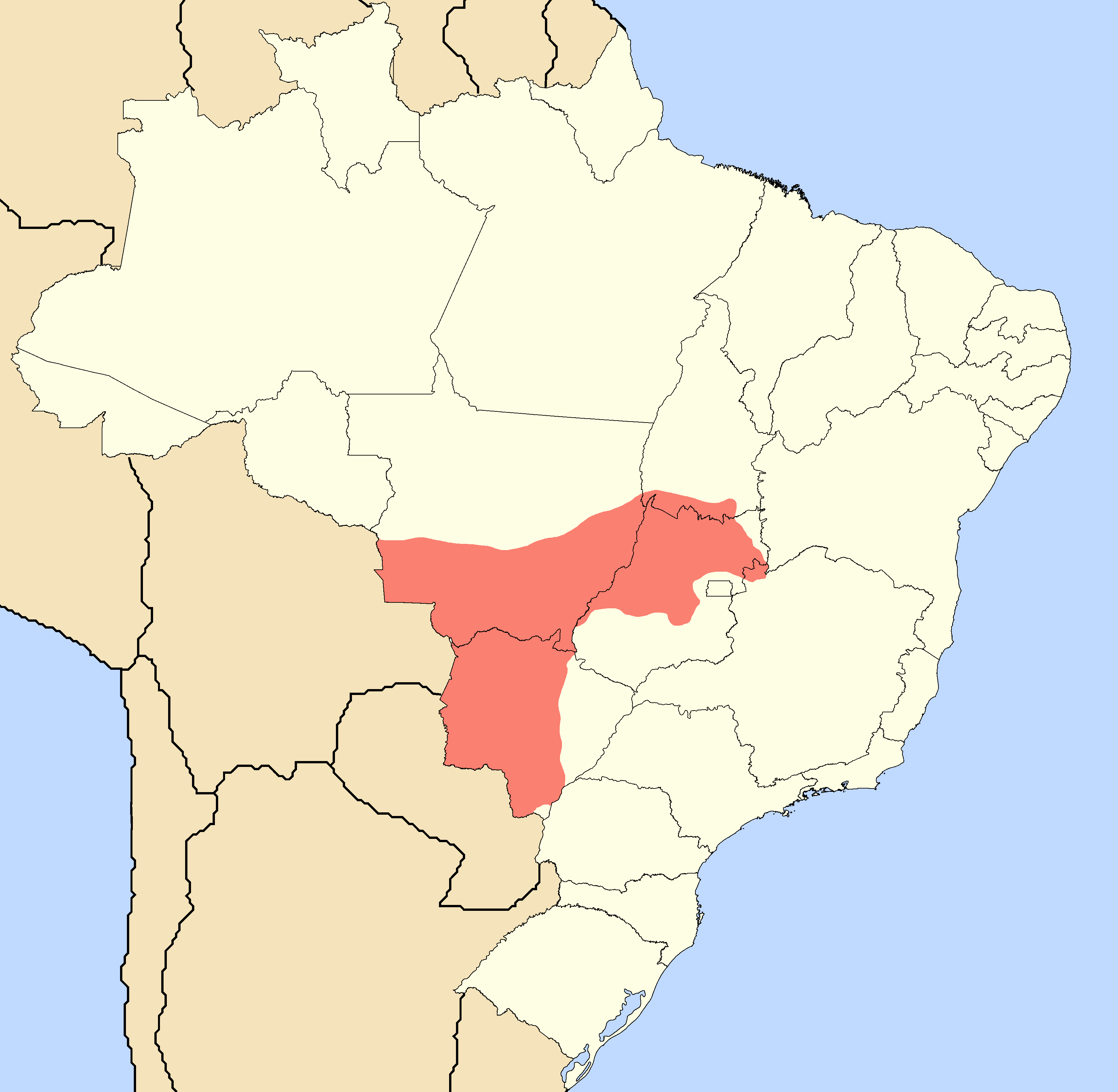
- Approximate range of the dialect over a map of Brazil.

Sertanejo is a dialect of Portuguese spoken in parts of the Brazilian states of Mato Grosso, Mato Grosso do Sul, Goiás, Minas Gerais and Tocantins. The Sertanejo dialect is closely related to the Caipira dialect spoken to its south, from which it split in the early to mid 20th century.

== Subdialects ==
Subdialects of Sertanejo include:

- Baixada Cuiabana
- Campo Grande
- Goiás
- Pantanal
- Alto Pantanal

== Characteristics ==
Differently from some other Brazilian Portuguese dialects, the /s/ and /z/ sounds are never palatalized in Sertanejo, as opposed to the /d/ and /t/ sounds when followed by /i/, which are always palatalized into /d͡ʒ/ or /t͡ʃ/. Sertanejo speakers tend to morph the /ɾ/ sound into /ɹ/, which also occurs in the Caipira dialect.

== Vocabulary ==
Word	Standard Portuguese equivalent	Meaning
Vôte		Interjection
Guria	Menina	Girl
Guri	Menino	Boy
Gurizada	Galera	Guys
Quebra-mola	Lombada	Speed bump
Canhaém		Interjection
Digoreste	Ótimo	Great
Moage	Frescura	Fussy
Custoso	Burro	Dumb
Dar rata	Passar Vergonha	To embarrass oneself
Balão	Rotatória	Roundabout
Prego	Pessoa incoveniente	Inconvenient person
Pelejar	Insistir	Insist
Coró	Lagarta	Caterpillar
Mocozar	Roubar	Rob
Grilar	Irritar	To piss off
Ridicar	Agir de maneira egoísta	To act egotistically
Skinny	Salgadinho	Snack
Uai		Interjection
Trem	Coisa	Thing
Trela	Rir	Laugh
