= Comparison of Portuguese and Spanish =

Linguistic comparison

Portuguese and Spanish, although closely related Romance languages, differ in many aspects of their phonology, grammar, and lexicon. Both belong to a subset of the Romance languages known as West Iberian Romance, which also includes several other languages or dialects with fewer speakers, all of which are mutually intelligible to a considerable degree.

The most obvious differences between Spanish and Portuguese are in pronunciation. Mutual intelligibility is greater when written rather than spoken. Compare, for example, the following sentences—roughly equivalent to the English proverb "A word to the wise is sufficient," or, a more literal translation, "To a good listener, a few words are enough.":

Al buen entendedor pocas palabras bastan (Spanish pronunciation: [al ˈβwen entendeˈðoɾ ˈpokas paˈlaβɾas ˈβastan])
Ao bom entendedor poucas palavras bastam (European Portuguese: [aw ˈβõ ẽtẽdɨˈðoɾ ˈpokɐʃ pɐˈlavɾɐʒ ˈβaʃtɐ̃w]).

There are also some differences between European and Brazilian Portuguese as there are between British and American English or Peninsular and Latin American Spanish. This article notes these differences below only where:

- both Brazilian and European Portuguese differ not only from each other, but from Spanish as well;
- both Peninsular (i.e., European) and Latin American Spanish differ not only from each other, but also from Portuguese; or
- either Brazilian or European Portuguese differs from Spanish with syntax not possible in Spanish (while the other dialect does not).

== Sample texts ==
Portuguese and Spanish share a great number of words that are spelled identically or almost identically (although the pronunciation almost always differs), or which often differ in predictable ways. The following paragraph, taken from the Gramática esencial del español, by Manuel Seco (Espasa-Calpe, 1989), is contrasted with the literal Portuguese translation below, with notable lexical similarities and differences of word order:

Pero, a pesar de esta variedad de posibilidades que la voz posee, sería un instrumento de comunicación muy pobre si no contara más que con ella. La capacidad de expresión del hombre no dispondría de más medios que la de los animales. La voz, sola, es para el hombre apenas una materia informe, que para convertirse en un instrumento perfecto de comunicación debe ser sometida a un cierto tratamiento. Las manipulaciones que recibe la voz, son las "articulaciones". (Spanish)

Mas, apesar da variedade de possibilidades que a voz possui, essa seria um instrumento de comunicação muito pobre se se contasse só com ela. A capacidade de expressão do homem não disporia de mais meios que a dos animais. A voz, sozinha, é para o homem apenas uma matéria informe, que para se transformar num instrumento perfeito de comunicação, tem que ser sujeita a certos processos. As manipulações que a voz recebe, são as "articulações". (Portuguese)

But, despite this variety of possibilities that the voice possesses, it would be a very poor instrument of communication if there were no more to it. Man's capacity for expression would not have any more tools than that of animals. The voice alone is for man just a formless medium, which to become a perfect communication instrument must be subjected to certain processes. The manipulations that the voice undergoes are the "articulations". (English)

The following sample is taken from the newspaper El País. Because it uses everyday language, it has fewer cognates, making the two languages more distant and resulting in low intelligibility for speakers who have no (formal) knowledge of or exposure to the other language.

Más de 200 personas encendieron hogueras e intentaron acercarse de nuevo a la delegación, la meta que no lograron el día anterior. Más contenedores ardieron en esas calles. Varias furgonetas de la Policía cargaron e intentaron hacerles frente. Pero lejos de arredrarse, los manifestantes corrieron contra un grupo de agentes que se quedó solo en la vía. La policía los dispersó disparando pelotas de goma, hasta lograr resguardarse de nuevo en la calle de Mallorca. La tensión se masticaba entre los agentes, rodeados de hogueras. (Spanish)

Mais de 200 pessoas atearam fogo e tentaram aproximar-se de novo à estação, um alvo não atingido no dia anterior. Mais contentores foram incendiados nas ruas. Várias viaturas policiais intervieram e tentaram confrontá-las. Mas em vez de recuar, os manifestantes viraram-se contra um grupo isolado de agentes na estrada. A polícia dispersou-os disparando balas de borracha e abrigou-se novamente na Rua de Maiorca. A tensão era palpável nos policiais, cercados por focos de incêndio. (Portuguese)

More than 200 people again lit bonfires and tried to approach the station, a goal they did not achieve the day before. More containers were burned in the streets. Several loaded police vans attempted to confront them. But far from being intimidated, the protesters moved against an isolated group of agents on the road. The police dispersed them by shooting rubber bullets and managed to take cover again on Mallorca Street. The tension was palpable among the police, as they were surrounded by bonfires. (English)

== Vocabulary ==
=== Cognates ===
Many lexical differences between Spanish and Portuguese come from the influence of the Arabic language on Spanish vocabulary, which is significantly lower in Portuguese. Most of the similarities and cognate words in the two languages have their origin in Latin, meaning that both languages share many common root words. A relevant number of those cognates, however, differ semantically: similar words have different meanings. Portuguese has more specific terms and expressions which do not occur, or are not directly translatable, in Spanish. Several key differences reflect the unique historical and cultural development of each of these two languages. Levels of understanding in the written forms are much higher than in the spoken forms. Mutual intelligibility varies among interlocutors and contexts. Some of the similarities and differences are listed below.

==== One form vs. multiple forms ====
In some instances, a single word can have multiple meanings in one language, while these meanings are expressed by different words in the other:

- Portuguese criar corresponds to both Spanish crear 'to create' and criar 'to raise'.
- Spanish sueño (a noun that can mean either 'dream' or 'sleep') corresponds to both Portuguese sonho 'dream' and sono 'sleep' (the former from Latin somnium and the latter from somnus, which merged into the same word in Spanish).

==== False friends ====
Significant pairs of cognates have a broader or narrower meaning in one language than in the other, are disused, or their meanings are entirely different. On this basis they are termed "false friends":

Spanish	Portuguese	English
cola (< Lat. cauda)	fila; bicha; linha (< Fr. file; < Lat. bestius; < Lat. linea)	queue, file
cola (< Lat. cauda)	cauda; rabo (< Lat. cauda; < Lat. rapum)	tail
vaso (< Lat. vasum)	copo (< Lat. cuppa)	glass, cup
copo (< Lat. cuppa)	floco (< Lat. floccus)	flake
competencia (< Lat. competentia)	concorrência, competição (< Lat. concurrentia; competitio)	competition
despido (< Lat. expetere)	demissão (< Lat. dimissĭo), despedimento	dismissal, firing
oso (< Lat. ursus)	urso (< Lat. ursus)	bear
pez (< Lat. piscis)	peixe (< Lat. piscis < Indo-European *peysk-)	fish
polvo (< Lat. pulvis)	pó (< Lat. pulv(er)is)	dust
tienda (< Lat. tenda < tendĕre)	loja; negócio; butique; estabelecimento; depósito (< Fr. loge < Frankish laubja; < Lat. negotium; < Fr. boutique < Lat. apotheca; < Lat. stabilire; < Lat. depositum)	shop, business, depot
ganancia (< Gothic ganan)	ganho, lucro, interesse, rendimento, proveito, vencimento, acréscimo (< Frankish waidanjan; < Lat. lucrum; < Lat. interesse; < Lat. re- + dare; < Lat. profectus; < Lat. vincere; < Lat. accrescere + suffix -imo)	profit, gain, interest
inversión (< Lat. inversionis)	investimento (< Lat. investire)	investment
embarazada (< Port. embaraçada)	grávida (< Lat. gravō + -idus/-ida)	pregnant
estafa (< Ital. staffa)	calote, fraude, burla (< Fr. culotte; < Lat.fraudis; < probably Lat. burrŭla)	swindle, fraud, trickery
exquisito (< Lat. exquisitus)	refinado; esmerado (< Lat. re + finis; < Lat. exmerare)	exquisite
molestia (< Lat. moles)	incómodo, inconveniência, maçada, distúrbio (< Lat. incommodus; < Lat. inconvenientis; < Lat. matea + Port. -ada; < Lat. disturbĭum)	inconvenience, disturbance
fechar (v) (< Lat. facta)	datar (v) (< Lat. datum)	to date (v)
servicios (< Lat. servitium)	lavabo, lavatório, toilette, toalete, WC, sanitário (< Lat. lavabo; < Lat. lavatorium; < Fr. toilette; < Eng. water closet; < Lat. sanitas)	toilet, WC, lavatory
perro (probably < onomatopoeic perr)	cão (< Lat. canis), cachorro (< Lat. catulus + Basque -orro)	dog
berro (< Celt. beruros)	agrião (< Gr. ágrios)	watercress
aceite (< Ar. az-zayt)	óleo (< Lat. oleum)	oil
oficina (< Lat. officīna < officium < opus + ficium)	escritório, gabinete, atelier, agência, cartório, bureau/birô, departamento, workshop, oficina de reparação automóvel, garagem auto-mecânica (< Lat. scriptorĭum; < Fr. cabinet; < Fr. atelier; < Ital. agenzia; < Lat. carta + suffix -ório; < Fr. atelier; < Lat. departimentum; < Lat. + Gr departimentum; < Eng. workshop; < Fr. garage + Gr. αὐτο + Lat. mechanicus)	office, workshop
firma (< Lat. firmus)	assinatura (< Lat. signator)	signature
presunto (< Lat. praesumptus)	presumível, suspeito, provável (< Lat. praesumptus; < Lat. suspectum; < Lat. probabilis)	presumed, suspect
risco (< Lat. resecare)	falésia (< Fr. falaise)	cliff
topo (< Lat. talpa)	toupeira (< Lat. talpa + Port. -eira)	mole, moleskin

Portuguese	Spanish	English
cola (< Lat. coloere)	pegamento, cola (< Lat. pix, < Lat. coloere)	glue
vaso (< Lat. vasum)	maceta, tiesto (< Hisp.-Ar. maceta, maybe < Ital. mazzetto; < Lat. testu)	vase, flowerpot
floco (< Lat. floccus)	copo (< Lat. cuppa)	flake
competência (< Lat. competentia)	aptitud, capacidad (< Lat. aptitūdo; capacĭtātis)	competence, competency
despido (< Lat. expedire)	desnudo (< Lat. ex + nudus)	naked
osso (< Lat. ossum)	hueso (< Lat. ossum)	bone
pez (< Lat. pix)	brea (< Fr. brayer)	pitch, resin
polvo (< Gr. πολύπους)	pulpo (< Gr. πολύπους)	octopus
tenda (< Lat. tenda < tendĕre)	tienda, lona, toldo (< Lat. tenda < tendĕre; < Fr. Olonne; < Fr. taud < Old Germ. tialz)	tent, marquee
ganância (< Gothic ganan)	codicia, avaricia, afán (< Lat. cupiditia; < Lat. avaritia; probably < Lat. afannae)	greed, avarice, covetousness
inversão (< Lat. inversionis)	inversión (< Lat. inversionis)	inversion
embaraçada (< Lat. in + O.Port. baraça, of uncertain origin)	avergonzada (< Lat. verecundia)	embarrassed
estafa (< Ital. staffa)	agotamiento, fatiga, extenuación (< Lat. gutta; < Lat. fatigāre; < Lat. extenuāre)	exhaustion, tiredness, wear out
esquisito (< Lat. exquisitus)	raro, extraño, peculiar (< Lat. rarus; < Lat. extrāneus; < Lat. peculiāris)	odd, strange, peculiar
moléstia (< Lat. molestiae)	enfermedad, achaque, plaga, peste (< Lat. infirmitas; < Ar. šakā; < Lat. plaga; < Lat. pestis )	disease, plague
serviço (< Lat. servitium)	servicio (< Lat. servitium)	service
perro (origin uncertain, maybe < Sp. perro)	oxidado (< Greek oxis + Lat. suffix -tatus)	rusty
berro (< Lat. barrire)	chillido, berrido (< Lat. cisclare; < Lat. barrire)	screech, shriek
aceite (< Lat. acceptāre)	aceptado (< Lat. acceptāre)	accepted
oficina (< Lat. officīna < officium)	taller; taller de coches; taller mecánico de autos (< Old Fr. astelier; < Old Fr. estalier + Lat. cocca; < Old Fr. astelier + Lat. mechanicus + Gr. αὐτο)	auto repair centre, repair garage, workshop
firma (< Lat. firmus)	empresa; compañía; sociedad, negocio (< Lat. prenhendere; companio; societas; nec otium)	business, firm, company, corporation, enterprise, venture, establishment, group, house
fechar (v) (< Lat. pesclum)	cerrar (v) (< Lat. serrare)	to close, to lock (v)
presunto (< Lat. persuctus)	jamón (< Fr. jambon)	ham, prosciutto
risco (< Lat. reseca)	riesgo (< Arabic rizq or maybe Italian rischio)	risk, line
topo (< Gr. tópos)	cumbre (< Lat. columen or culmen)	top

==== Semantic change ====
Many pairs of cognates have come to have different meanings due to semantic change. These false friends include the following:

- Spanish diseñar means 'to design' in Spanish, while its Portuguese cognate desenhar means 'to draw'.
- Similarly, Spanish dibujo for 'drawing', with an archaic Portuguese equivalent debuxo meaning 'sketch' and was displaced by rascunho; in turn the cf. Spanish rasguño means 'scratch' (compare "scratchpad", i.e. notebook, in English).
- Spanish largo (rare/archaic luengo) means 'long', while ancho means 'wide'. In Portuguese largo (rare/archaic ancho) means 'wide' and longo like in English 'long'.
- Spanish extrañar can mean 'to find strange' or 'to miss'. Portuguese estranhar means 'to find strange', or to lock horns.
- Spanish raro can mean 'rare' or 'strange'. In Portuguese, it just means 'rare'.
- Spanish aún can mean 'yet/still' and todavía can mean both 'yet/still' or 'however/nevertheless'. Portuguese todavia means 'however/nevertheless'. In Portuguese, 'yet/still' is ainda.
- Spanish (estar) embarazada means '(to be) pregnant'. Portuguese (estar) embaraçada means '(to be) embarrassed' or '(to be) entangled'. However, Spanish does have the term embarazoso/a meaning 'embarrassing'. 'Pregnant' in Portuguese is grávida (cognate of less user word in Spanish). The Portuguese prenhe and Spanish preñada are used mainly for pregnant animals but rarely for women, in both languages
- Spanish exquisito means 'exquisite/sophisticated'. Portuguese esquisito means 'strange/weird'.
- Experto means 'expert' Spanish. In Portuguese its homophone esperto means 'smart/intelligent/clever'. In Portuguese you may also find perito, especialista, or exímio, which have the same in Spanish (Sp. eximio is spelled without the accent mark).
- Spanish escoba is 'broom'. Portuguese escova is 'brush' (Portuguese uses 'vassoura' for 'broom'). However, in some varieties of Spanish, escobilla or escobeta means 'toilet brush'.
- Spanish apellido 'surname' is apelido in European Portuguese, and sobrenome in both Brazilian and European Portuguese (but Portuguese usually say apelido). Spanish sobrenombre/apodo 'nickname' is apelido/alcunha/codinome in Brazilian Portuguese, and alcunha in European Portuguese.
- Spanish rojo is 'red'. Portuguese roxo is 'purple'. 'Red' in Portuguese is vermelho (cognate with Spanish bermejo and bermellón, which mean 'vermilion' or 'cinnabar'). In European Portuguese the word encarnado (literally in the flesh) is also used as synonym of 'red' even though vermelho is more frequent.
- Spanish rubio means 'blond hair'. Portuguese ruivo or ruço means 'red hair'.
- Spanish apenas means 'hardly'. Portuguese apenas is 'only'. Thus the Spanish phrase él apenas pudo dormir means 'he could not even/hardly sleep', or 'he was just barely able to sleep', whereas the Portuguese phrase ele pôde apenas dormir means 'all he could do was sleep'.
- Spanish vaso means 'drinking glass (tumbler)', while Portuguese vaso means flower pot or toilet (from vaso sanitário). A 'drinking glass' in Portuguese is copo, while Spanish copa is a wine glass. A wine glass in Portuguese is copo, taça is a champagne glass or dessert cup (i.e. chocolate mousse or ice cream) while Spanish taza is a 'coffee cup or teacup'; Spanish taza also refers to a toilet bowl. 'Coffee cup' in Portuguese is xícara de café/chávena, while Spanish jícara is 'bowl' or 'gourd.'
- Spanish (and European Portuguese) cachorro means puppy, while in Brazilian Portuguese, it can refer to a dog of any age.

==== Frequent function words ====
A number of the frequent "function words" (pronouns, conjunctions, etc.) are cognates in the two languages but are used in slightly different ways, including the following:

===== Spanish todo, Portuguese tudo =====
The Spanish pronoun todo can mean 'all/every', or 'everything'. Portuguese distinguishes between todo 'all/every' (masculine) and tudo 'everything' (neuter, used for an indefinite object or abstraction).

Todos los insectos tienen seis patas. (Spanish)
Todos os insectos têm seis patas. (Portuguese)
'All insects have six legs.'

El ladrón lo robó todo. (Spanish)
O ladrão roubou tudo. (Portuguese)
'The thief stole everything' or 'The thief stole it all.'

===== Relative and interrogative pronouns =====
Spanish uses an acute accent on interrogative pronouns, while the corresponding relative pronouns (etymologically the same words) are spelled without the accent to mark the difference in prosodic stress. (As explained below, the acute accent often changes the vowel sound in Portuguese, but not Spanish.) For example, ¿quién? (who?) and quien (who) in Spanish, but quem for both in Portuguese. Apart from that, while "quem" is invariable, Spanish has both the singular "quién" and the plural "quiénes". As shown by the examples below, the difference between singular and plural is highlighted by the use of "é" for singular and "são" for plural:

Example 1:

¿Quién es ese hombre? (Spanish)
Quem é esse homem? (Portuguese)
'Who's that man?' (English - "who" is invariable)

¿Quiénes son esas personas? (Spanish)
Quem são essas pessoas? (Portuguese)
'Who are those people?' (English - again, "who" is invariable)

(In the Portuguese examples, the "m" at the end of "quem" is a marker for nasalization (as is the nasal diphthong "ão" in "são". Thus, it is not pronounced.)

===== Spanish muy and mucho, Portuguese muito =====
Spanish distinguishes mucho 'much/many' from muy 'very/quite'. Portuguese uses muito for both (though the archaic mui was used similarly to Spanish muy).

Saqué muchas fotos durante el viaje. (Spanish)
Tirei muitas fotos durante a viagem. (Portuguese)
'I took many photos during the trip.'

Las cerezas están muy maduras. (Spanish)
As cerejas estão muito maduras. (Portuguese)
'The cherries are quite ripe.'

El auto anda muy lento. (Spanish)
O carro é muito lento. (Portuguese)
'The car goes very slow.'

Intentaba mucho no hacer mucho ruido. (Spanish)
Tentava muito não fazer muito barulho (Portuguese)
'I was trying so hard to be quiet.'

Tienes que pensar mucho más. (Spanish)
Tem de pensar muito mais. (Portuguese)
'You have to think a lot more.'

As an adjective, muito is inflected according to the gender and number of the noun it qualifies, like mucho. As an adverb, it is invariable like muy. Thus, it would be incorrect to say *muitas maduras in the second example.

===== Cardinal numbers =====
The cardinal numbers are very similar in Spanish and Portuguese, but there are differences of usage in numbers one and two. Spanish has different words for the masculine singular indefinite article ('a, an') and the numeral 'one', thus un capítulo 'a chapter', but capítulo uno 'chapter one'. In Portuguese, both words are the same: um capítulo and capítulo um. Spanish uno can also be used as a pronoun, like the English generic "one", to represent an indeterminate subject, but this is not possible with Portuguese um; the reflexive pronoun se must be used instead. Se may be used in Spanish to form passive and impersonal constructions, as well.

Uno (or Se) debe pensar antes de actuar. (Spanish)
Deve-se pensar antes de agir. (Portuguese)
'One should think before acting.'

This still applies in cases where a relatively indeterminate subject is genderized, such as the Spanish todos a una [voz] ('all at once', literally 'all at one [voice]'). It should be rewritten in Portuguese without any cardinal number. For example, todos juntos 'all together'.

On the other hand, in Portuguese, cardinal number 'two' inflects with gender (dois if masculine, duas if feminine), while in Spanish dos is used for both.

Uno más uno es igual a dos. (Spanish)
Um mais um é igual a dois. (Portuguese)
'One plus one equals two.'

Dos cabezas piensan mejor que una. (Spanish)
Duas cabeças pensam melhor que uma. (Portuguese)
'Two heads think better than one.'

Tengo dos hermanos y dos hermanas. (Spanish)
Tenho dois irmãos e duas irmãs. (Portuguese)
'I have two brothers and two sisters.'

===== Conjunctions =====
The conjunction "and" in Spanish is y (pronounced [i] before a consonant, [j] before a vowel) before all words except those beginning with an [i] sound (spelled i- or hi-). Before a syllabic [i] sound (and not the diphthong [je] as in hierro), the Spanish conjunction is e [e̞]. Portuguese uses e [i] before all words.

Sal y pimienta. (Spanish)
Sal e pimenta. (Portuguese)
'Salt and pepper.'

Judío e hindú. (Spanish)
Judeu e hindu. (Portuguese)
'Jewish and Hindu.'

Leones y hienas. (Spanish)
Leões e hienas. (Portuguese)
'Lions and hyenas.'

Similarly, for the conjunction "or", Spanish uses o [o̞] before all words except those beginning with o- or ho-, in which case it uses u [w]. Portuguese always uses ou [ow]~[o].

Vino o agua. (Spanish)
Vinho ou água. (Portuguese)
'Wine or water.'

Uno u otro. (Spanish)
Um ou outro. (Portuguese)
'One or the other.'

===== Se, si, sí, and sim =====
In Portuguese, the word se can be a reflexive pronoun or a conjunction meaning 'if'. This may give the false impression that a Portuguese verb is pronominal when it is not. For example, Se ficou em Paris... means 'If he/she/it stayed in Paris...' When the conjunction se precedes a pronominal verb, it is common to have a double se in the sentence, such as Se se esqueceu da sua senha... 'If you forgot your password...'

Meaning and description	Spanish	Portuguese
'yes'	sí	sim [sĩ]
'himself' / 'herself' / 'itself' / 'themselves' (stressed reflexive pronoun, object of preposition)	sí	si
'if' (conjunction)	si	se
/'oneself" /'yourself" / 'itself' / 'themselves' (unstressed reflexive pronoun)	se	se

===== Indirect object pronouns =====
Spanish le and les are changed to se when followed by lo, la, los, or las. For example, "Mi abuelo les compró los regalos" becomes "Mi abuelo se los compró". See also "Combining pronouns in Spanish" below. In addition, Spanish uses sé as an irregular verb in the first person singular indicative of saber (to know), and the second person singular imperative of ser (to be). In Portuguese, these are sei and sê respectively.

=== Dissimilar words ===
Despite the mostly cognate vocabulary between Spanish and Portuguese, a significant number of common words are entirely different in the two languages (although in some cases cognates exist, but are rare or archaic in one of the two languages). Examples include the following:

Meaning	Spanish	Portuguese	Notes
alibi	coartada < Lat. coarctare	álibi < Lat. alibi	
store, shop	tienda < Late Lat. tendam (< tendere)	loja < Fr. loge < Frankish laubja	
knee	rodilla < Lat. rotellam ('little wheel')	joelho < Lat. genuculum	The learned word rótula ('kneecap' in both Sp. and Port.) is from the same root as Spanish rodilla. Sp. de hinojos 'kneeling' is from the same source as Port. joelho.
home	hogar < Lat. focus	Lar < Lat. Lar	Spanish also has lar: both words can also be used to mean "fireplace" (lareira in Pt.)
street	calle < Lat. callem	rua < Lat. [viam] rūgam	
prosecutor	fiscal < Lat. fiscalis	procurador < Lat. procurator	
highway, road	carretera < carreta + -era < carro < Lat. carrus < Gaulish carros	estrada < Lat. strata	
retailer	minorista < Lat. minor + ista	retalhista < Late Lat. taliare + ista	Brazilian Port. uses varejista
sales	rebajas < Lat. prefix 're' + bassus	saldos, liquidação < Ita. saldo < soldo, Lat. liquidus	
grocer	abarrotero Uncertain < Lat. or < Pre-Roman barra	merceeiro < Lat. merx + suffix eiro	
organic food	comida orgánica < Lat. + Greek comeder+organĭcum < órganon	alimentação biológica, Bio < Lat. + Greek alere + βίος+λογία	Brazilian Port. tends to use orgânica.
funnel	embudo < Lat. imbūtum	funil < Lat. fundere	
fight, brawl	pelea < Lat. pilus	briga < Ita. or Occitan briga	
riff-raff, mob, scum	chusma < Genoese ciüsma < Gr. κέλευσμα	canalha, ralé, escumalha < Occitan canalha, < French ralée, < Frankish skum + (pejorative suffix) alha	Brazilian Port. tends to use ralé, gentalha
police station	comisaría (de policía) < Lat. + Gr. comissarius + politia < πολιτεία	esquadra, posto de polícia < Lat. + Gr. ex-quadrata, positus + politia < πολιτεία	Brazilian Port. tends to use delegacia (de polícia)
litter, rubbish	basura < Lat. versūra	lixo < Lat. līx < līcis	
hole	agujero < Lat. + suffix acucŭla + ero	buraco < Proto-Germanic burō, burōną	
drill	taladro < Lat. taratrum	berbequim < Fr. vilebrequin < Dutch wimmelkijn	Brazilian Por. uses furadeira
demolition hammer	rompedor < Lat. rumpere + dor	martelo demolidor < Lat. martulus demolitio + dor	
sauce	salsa < Lat. salsus	molho < Lat. manuculus < manipulus	Spanish (specifically Mexican Sp.) has mole, but this is a false cognate deriving from Nahuatl mōlli.
plane	cepilladora < Lat. cippus + dora	plaina < Lat. planea	
camshaft, camshaft tree	árbol de levas < Lat. arbōs + levare	árvore de cames < Lat. + Germanic arbōs + kamm	
gills	branquias < Lat. < Gr. branchĭa < βραγχια	guelras < Proto-Germanic gelunaz	In zoology, Port. also uses brânquias (branchiae).
goose	oca < Lat. auca	ganso < Gothic/Suebian gans	Spanish also has ganso.
chicken	pollo < Lat. pullus	frango < Probably Fr. francolin < Ita. francolino, all of uncertain origin	
lamp	lámpara < Lat. lampăda	candeeiro < Lat. candelae	Portuguese lâmpada usually means 'light bulb' (except in certain idioms, like lâmpada de Aladino, i.e., 'Aladdin's lamp')
meal	comida < Lat. comedere	refeição, repasto (arch.) < Lat. refectionis, re+pastus	In Portuguese 'comida' means food
owl	búho < Lat. bubo	coruja (*maybe from Lat. cunicularis) of uncertain origin	Some species of owl are called bufo in Portuguese
kennel	perrera < uncertain origin, perhaps Pre-Roman. perro + era	canil < Lat. canis + il	
cattery	criadero < Lat. creāre + era	gatil < Proto-Ger. kattuz + il	
ground	suelo < Lat. solum	chão < Lat. planus	Port. also has solo.
office	despacho < Lat. dispactus	gabinete, escritório < Occitan, Lat. cabana, scriptōrium	
ground floor	planta baja < Lat. planta + bassus	rés-do-chão, rés-de-chão< Lat. rāsus + planus	Brazilian Port. tends to use térreo
buoy	flotador < Fr. + Sp. suffix flotter + dor	boia < Old Fr. bouée < Frankish baukan	
nappy, diaper (baby)	pañal < Lat. pannus	fralda < Gothic falthan/faldan	
performance	actuación < Lat. actuare, representación < Lat. representatio	performance < Eng 'performance' < Anglo-French performer < parfornir	
preemptive	preventivo < Lat. praeventus	preemptivo < Eng 'preemptive' < Lat praeemptio	
report	informe < Lat. informis	relatório < Lat. relatus + ório suffix < refferre	
highlight	realce < Lat. + prefix re + altiare	destaque < Germanic stak	
prison	cárcel < Lat. carcer	prisão< Lat. prehensionis	Span. also has prisión and estar a preso (to be in prison) and Port. archaic cárcere.
squirrel	ardilla < Pre-Roman harda or probably Berber aġárda	esquilo Lat. scūrĭōlus < Gr. σκίουρος	
garret, mansard	zaquizamí, buhardilla < Hisp-Ar. سقف في السماء (saqf fassamā), < Lat. bufus < buharda	água-furtada, mansarda < Lat. aquam + furtus, < Fr. mansarde < François Mansart (architect)	
watercress	berro < Celtic bẹrŭro	agrião < Gr. άγριος	
mint	menta < Lat. mentha < Gr. μίνθη	hortelã < Lat. hortus	Port. also has menta.
sour cherry	cereza gordal < Lat. cerasium + gurdus	ginja < Frankish wīhsina	
stepchild	hijastro(a) < Lat. filiaster	enteado(a) < Lat. ante + natum	
step-brother	hermanastro(a) < Lat. + suffix germanus + astro	meio-irmã(o) < Lat. medius + germānus	
stump, amputated limb	muñón < Pre-Roman/Basque muno	coto < Celtic-Goidelic cotach < cuid	
baby changing area	cambiador (infantil) < Lat + dor cambium	fraldário < Gothic + arius faldan	
blade	hoja < Lat. folium	lâmina < Lat. lammĭna	
butcher(s)(shop)	carniceria < Lat. carniceus	talho < Lat. taleare	Brazilian Port. uses açougue
shoe polish	betún < Lat. bitūmen	graxa < Lat. crassus	
shaving	afeitar < Lat. affectāre	barbear < Lat. barba + ear	
pocket knife	navaja < Lat. novacŭla	canivete < Old Fr. canivet < Frankish 'knif'	Port. also has 'navalha', meaning pocket knife or razor.
diving	buceo < Port. búzio < Lat. bucĭna	mergulho < Lat. merguliāre	
bait	cebo < Lat. cibus	isca < Lat. escae	
skirt	falda < Germanic faldan	saia < Lat. sagum < Celtic sagos, sag	
glasses	gafas < Uncertain, maybe Arabic qafca	óculos < Lat. oculus	
stiffness (muscular)	agujetas < Lat. acus + suffix eta	dor muscular < Lat. dolor + mus +culus	
operating theatre	quirófano < Gr. χείρ + φαίνω	sala de operações, sala de cirurgia, bloco operatório < Ger + Lat. sal + operatio, < Ger + Gr. sal + χειρουργική, < Ger + Lat. bluk(k)an + operatio	
stem cell research	investigación con células madre < Lat. vestigium + cum + cellula + mater	pesquisa de células estaminais < Lat. perquirere + de + cellula + staminis	Brazilian Por. uses pesquisa de células tronco
stream, creek	arroyuelo < Vulg.Lat. *arrugium < Pre-Roman arrugia	ribeira, ribeiro < Lat. riparius < ripae	
stubborn	terco or testarudo < Lat. testa + rudis	teimoso < Lat. thema, < Gr. théma	
plateau	meseta < Lat. mensa + Sp. suffix eta	planalto < Lat. planus + altus	
wave	ola < Uncertain origin	vaga < Gothic vega or < Old Norse vágr, both from Ancient Germanic 'vigan' to shake	Both in Brazilian Por. and European Por. onda is also used
broom	aulaga < Ar. algawláqa	vassoura, giesta, carqueja < Lat. verrere, < Lat. genista, < Maybe Lat. quercus	
pants, knickers	bragas < Lat. braca < Celtic bracae	cuecas < Lat. culus + suffix 'ecas'	
sheet (for a bed)	sábana < Lat. sabăna	lençol < Lat. linteolum	
basketball	baloncesto < Frankish balla + Lat. cista	basquetebol < Eng. basketball	Latin American Spanish prefers básquet, basquetbol and básquetbol
reporter	periodista, periodicista < periódico+ suffix 'ista'	repórter < Eng. reporter < Medieval Fr. reporteur	In Spanish reportero is sometimes used
ricochet	rebote < Frankish + Lat. prefix boter	ricochete < Fr. ricochet	
cashew	anacardo < Lat. anacardium	caju < Tupi aka'yu	Peruvian Spanish uses cajú, Dominican cajuil, Venezuelan caujil and rural Uruguayan cajuela and caguela.
mushroom	seta < Uncertain origin or hongo	cogumelo < Lat. cucumellum < cucuma	
oleander	adelfa < Ar. دفلى diflà	aloendro, loendro < Lat. lorandrum	
pumpkin	calabaza < Pre-Roman	abóbora < Lat. peporis	Port. cabaça means 'calabash'
squid	calamar < Lat. calamarius	lula < Lat. lura	Port. also has calamar
date	fecha < Lat. facta	data < Lat. data	
elsewhere, somewhere, nowhere	en otro lugar < Lat. in alter localis, en alguna parte < Lat. in aliquis unos pars, en ningún lugar < Lat. in nec unus localis	alhures < Provençal alhors, algures < Lat. + Provençal aliquod + hors, nenhures < Lat. + Provençal nec + hors	
nobody	nadie < Lat. nati < natus	ninguém < Lat. nec + quem	
lawn	césped < Lat. caespes	relvado, grama < Lat. relevare, < Lat. gramen	Certain dialects of Spanish use grama
holiday, vacation	vacaciones < Lat. vacatio < vacationis	Férias < Lat. feriae	In Latin America, (día) feriado means "public holiday"
card	tarjeta < Fr. targe + diminutive suffix eta	cartão, carta < Gr. χάρτης < Lat. charta	
beef steak	filete < Lat. filum	bife < Eng. beef steak	Port. also has filé Spanish also has bife (only used in Argentina and other Latin American countries)
retaliation	retorsión < Lat. retorsus	retaliação < Lat. retalio	
remorse	arrepentimiento < Lat. re + paenitere	remorso(s) < Lat. remorsus < remordere	Sp. also has remordimiento and Port. also has arrependimento
boot (car)	maletero < Old Fr. + Sp. suffix malle + eta + ero	porta-bagagens < Lat. + Germanic portare + baugaz	Brazilian Port. tends to use porta-malas or bagageira
glove box (car)	guantero < Frankish + Sp. suffix want + ero	porta-luvas < Lat. + Gothic/Suebian portare + lôfa	
thin	delgado < Lat. delicātum	magro < Lat. macrum	
surface, peel	superficie < Lat. superficĭes	tona < Celt. tondā/tunna	Port. also has superfície.
earring	pendiente < Lat. pendere	brinco < Lat. vinculum	
watermelon	sandía < Ar. sindiyyah	melancia < balancia < Lat. bilanx	
passion fruit	fruto de la pasión < Lat. fructa + passio	maracujá < Tupi moruku'ia	Sp. also has maracuyá; Caribbean Sp. uses parcha
window	ventana < Lat. ventānam	janela < Lat. iānuellam	Lat. ventānam 'wind opening' < ventus 'wind'. Lat. iānuella is a diminutive of iānua 'door, opening' (the same root as Eng. January and janitor) < the name ianus, the God of gates or doors.
counter	ventanilla < Lat. ventānam + suffix 'illa'	balcão < Germanic balkōn	In Spanish balcón means 'balcony'
to disrupt, to get in the way (of someone/smthg)	molestar, estorbar < Lat. molestus, exturbāre	atrapalhar < Low-Frankish trappa	
to erase	borrar < Late Lat. burrāre	apagar < Lat. appācāre	Sp. apagar means 'to turn off' (a meaning that also exists in Port., e.g. apagar a luz 'to turn off the light').
to forget	olvidar < Lat. oblītāre	esquecer < Lat. excadescere	Olvidar also exists in Port. (literary or poetic contexts, mostly). A learned cognate, obliterar, exists in both languages.
to retort, to strike back	contraatacar < Lat. + Ita. contra + attaccare	ripostar < Fr. riposter	
to throw, to add	echar < Lat. iactare	atirar, pôr < Gothic/Suebian taíran, < Lat. ponere < pono	
to smell	oler < Lat. olēre	cheirar < Lat. flagrāre	
to snore	roncar < Lat. ronchus < Gr. ῥέγχος	ressonar Prefix + < Lat. re + sonare	Por. uses roncar for very loud snoring in humans or animal sounds i.e. pigs
to rummage, to snoop	hurgar < Lat. furicāre	vasculhar < Proto-Celt. baski	
slug	babosa < Lat. baba + osa	lesma < Lat. limax	
simple	sencillo < Lat. singulus	simples < Lat. simplex	Sp. also has simple.
stage	escenario < Lat. scenarium	palco < Langobardic palk	
fear	temor < Lat. timore	receio < Lat. re + celare	Port. also has temor.
harvest, crop	cosecha < Lat. collecta	seara < Celtic seni + aro	Port. colheita and recolha (both < Lat. collecta) generally refer to the harvest of crops, wine or data collection (i.e. online surveys, personal data).
black	negro < Lat. niger	preto < Lat. pressus 'compressed, dense'	Port. also has negro and Sp. also has prieto. Use and connotation vary greatly (i.e. the use of preto to refer to people of African descent is considered a slur in Port. but the prieto in Sp. can often mean "dark", "tan", or "swarthy" in a similar fashion to moreno in both Sp. and Port.).
near	cerca < Lat. circa	perto perh. < Lat. *prettus, alteration of pressus 'compressed'	
far	lejos < Lat. laxius	longe < Lat. longe	
spark	chispa (onomatopoeic)	faísca < Germanic falwiskan	
shard	esquirla < Lat. schidia, < Indo-European skei	lasca < *Proto-Germanic laska	
toy	juguete < Lat. + Sp. suffix iocus + ete	brinquedo < Proto-Germanic blinkaną, blīkaną	
swine	cochino (onomatopoeic)	suíno < Latin suīnus < Proto-Germanic swīną	
dew	rocío < Lat. rosidus	orvalho < Gothic/Suebian 'ur' + 'vallen' < Proto-Germanic ūrą + fallaną	
pen	bolígrafo < Lat. bulla + Gr. γράφειν	caneta < Lat. cannae + Por. eta	
print (evidence)	huella < Lat. follare	marca < Germanic marka	
windrow	hilera < Lat. fīlum + Sp. -era	leira < Proto-Celtic ɸlāryo	
yesterday	ayer < Lat. ad heri	ontem < Lat. ad noctem	
to stay	quedarse < Lat. quietāre	ficar < Vulg.Lat. *figicāre	
hairdresser	peluquero < peluque < French perruque "wig"	cabeleireiro < cabeleira 'head of hair; wig' < cabelo < Lat. capillus	Port. peruca means 'wig'
chair	silla < Lat. sella	cadeira < Lat. *cathedra, perh. < Proto-Celtic *cathair	
cup, mug	taza < Arabic ṭassa	chávena < Malay chãvan < Chinese < chã-kvãn, caneca < Germanic can	Brazilian Port. tends to use xícara < Sp. jícara < Nahuatl xīcalli.
fork	tenedor < Lat. + Sp. suffix tenēre + dor	garfo < either via Lat. graphium or < Fr. greffe	
ladybird	mariquita < Lat. toponymic Maria + dimin.suffix 'quita'	Joaninha < Lat. toponymic Iohanna + dimin.suffix 'inha'	
robin	petirrojo < Lat. pectus + russus	pisco < Lat < Gaulish pincio	
peach	melocotón < Lat. malum cotonium	pêssego < Lat. persicum	
pillowcase	funda < Lat. fundus	fronha < Celt. srogna	
grasshopper	saltamontes < Lat. salto + mons	gafanhoto < Proto-Celtic gabalā	
weasel, skunk	mofeta < Ita. moffetta	doninha < Lat. domina + Port. suffix inha	
trousers	pantalón < Fr. pantalon < Ita. pantaleone	calças < Lat. calceu	
doorbell	timbre(de la puerta) < Fr. timbre	campainha < Lat. campana	Spanish also has campanilla.
thunder	trueno < Lat. tonare	trovão < Lat. turbōnis	
noise	ruido < Lat. rugitus	barulho < Gaulish bruge	Port. also has ruído, particularly for isolated/unexpected sounds or noises.
handicapped	minusválido < Lat. minus + valere	Deficiente < Lat. deficiens	
development	desarrollo < Lat. + prefix des rotulus	desenvolvimento < Lat. + des involvo	
unavoidable	indefectible < Lat. + prefix in defectibĭlis	incontornável < Lat. + prefix in con+tornare	
drug addict	drogadicto < Eng. drug addict	toxicodependente, drogado < Lat. toxicum + dependens, < Fr. drogue	Both Port. and Sp. have 'toxicomania' for drug addiction
budget	presupuesto < Lat. pre+sub+positus	orçamento < Uncertain, Ita. 'orza' or likely Frankish *lurz + Lat. orça + mentum	
to injure	lesionar < Lat. laesio	magoar < Lat. maculare or aleijar < Lat. læsio	Brazilian Port. tends to use machucar < Lat. marcus

Vocabulary differences between the two languages arose from various factors. Portuguese and Spanish evolved separately from the Middle-Ages onwards and Portuguese being more Atlantic, didn't absorb much Mediterranean influence:

==== French influence ====
Both Portuguese and, to a lesser degree, Spanish have borrowed loanwords either directly from French or by way of French as an intermediary from other (mostly Greco-Latin) sources. Here are some examples where Portuguese uses French-derived words in everyday situations (quotation marks mean unassimilated French spellings):

Meaning	Spanish	Portuguese	Notes
newspaper, journal	periódico < Lat. periodĭcus < gr. περιοδικός	jornal < Fr. journal	Spanish jornal means day's wage or daily-paid worker.
journalist	periodista < Lat. periodĭcus < gr. περιοδικός	jornalista < Fr. journaliste	
journey	recorrido < Lat. recurrēre	jornada < Provençal. jornada < jorn	
shop window	escaparate < Ned. schaprade	montra < Fr. montre	The French-derived term vitrina (in both Spa/Por) or vitrine (in Por) is also used.
badge	chapa< Onom. chapa	crachá < Fr. crachat	
boutique, clothes store	tienda< Lat. tenda	"boutique", butique < Fr. boutique	
scarf	bufanda < Uncertain, maybe O.Fra. bouffant	cachecol, "écharpe", echarpe < Fr. cache-col, écharpe	
bullet	pelota < Occ.pelota < Lat. pila	bala < Fr. balle	
blush, rouge	colorete < Lat. color,-ōris.	"rouge", ruge < Fr. rouge	
lampshade, bedside lamp	lámpara < Lat. < Gre. lampāda < λαμπάς	abajur < Fr. abat-jour	
Madam	señora < Lat. senĭorōris	Madame < Fr. Madame	
New Year's Eve	Nochevieja < Lat. noctis + veclus < vetūlus	"Réveillon" < Fr. Réveillon	
frisson	escalofrío < Lat. + prefix ex + cale+ frige	"frisson" < Fr. frisson	
gaffe, blunder	metedura de pata < Lat. + Ar. < mittēre + batt	gafe < Fr. gaffe	
beet(root)	remolacha < Ita. ramolaccio	beterraba < Fr. betterave	
brioche	bollo de leche < Lat. < bulla + lactis,	brioche < Fr. brioche	
croissant	medialuna < Lat. < media + luna	"croissant", croassã < Fr. croissant	Spanish also has less used cruasán
courgette, zucchini	calabacín < Pre-roman calabaza	"courgette", curgete < Fr. courgette	
blueberry	arándano < Celt + Lat. aran + rodamdārum	mirtilo < Fr. myrtille	In Por. arando < Celt aran means cranberry
billy club, truncheon	porra < Lat. porrum	cassetete, "casse-tête" < Fr. casse-tête	
creche	guardería infantil < Ger. + Lat. warda + infantīlis	creche < Fr. crèche	
dossier	informe < Lat.	"dossier", dossiê < Fra.	
trouser suit	traje sastre < Old Por. + < Cat. < Lat. trager Cat < Lat. sastre < sartōris	"tailleur" < Fra. tailleur	
omelette	tortilla < uncertain + suffix torta + illa	omelete < Fra. omelette	
swing	columpio < Leon. < Gr. columbiar < κολυμβᾶν kolymbân	balancé < Fra. balancé	
lipstick	pintalabios < Lat. pinctāre + labium	batom < Fra. bâton	
cap	gorra < uncertain gorra	boné < Fra. bonnet	
hat	sombrero < Lat subumbrāre	chapéu < O.Fra. chapel	Chapel also exists in Spanish
fanny, pussy	coño < Lat cunnus	chochota < Fra. chochotte	* popular slang/vulgar word in Brazil
station (train)	estación (ferrocarril) < Lat. statiōnis	gare < Fra. gare	The term gare in Port. is also used for bus-station.
quay, jetty, key	muelle < Lat. mollis	cais < Fr. quai	
vehicle	vehículo < Lat. vehicŭlum	viatura < Fr. voiture	
package, packaging	envase < Lat. in + vasum	embalagem < Fr. emballage	
rissole	empanadilla rellena < Lat. + prefix en + panis + re + plenus	rissol, rissole < Fra. rissole	
souvenir	recuerdo < Lat. recordāri	"souvenir", suvenir < Fr. souvenir	Spanish also has "souvenir"/suvenir
counter	taquilla < Ar. tāq	"guichet", guichê < Fr. guichet	
strike	huelga < Lat. follicāre	greve < Fr. grève	
vernissage	inauguración < Lat. inauguratiōnis.	"vernissage", vernissagem < Fr. vernissage	

==== Arabic influence ====
Spanish has significant Mozarabic vocabulary of Arabic origin, whereas Portuguese has markedly less of such influence. In most cases, there will also be a Latin, Gothic or Greek synonym in the Spanish lexicon, although not actively used. Here are a few examples:

Meaning	Spanish	Portuguese
cupboard, pantry	alacena < Hisp. Ar.< Arabic alhazána < hizānah	armário, dispensa < Lat. armarium, dispensare
mayor	alcalde < Hisp. Ar. < Arabic alqáḍi < qāḍi	presidente da câmara (municipal) / prefeito < Lat. praesidens + camara / praefēctus
bricklayer, stonemason	albañil < Hisp. Ar. < Arabic albanní < bannā	pedreiro < Lat. petra
potter	alfarero < Hisp. Ar. < Arabic alfaẖ ẖār < faẖ ẖār	oleiro < Lat. ollarius
vest	chaleco < Alg. Ar. < Turk xileco < yelek	colete < Ita. coletto
basil	albahaca < Hisp. Ar. < Arabic alḥabáqa < ḥabaqah	basílico, manjericão < Lat., uncertain origin basilicum, uncertain
bean	alubia < Hisp. Ar. < Arabic alubía < al-lubiya اٌٍىتيا	feijão < Lat. faseolus
celery	chirivía < Hisp. Ar. alcaravea < alkarawíyya	aipo < Lat. apium
watermelon	sandía < Hisp. Ar. < Arabic sindiyya ضىذيح	melancia < Lat. bilancia < bilanx
pistachio	alfóncigo, pistacho < Hisp. Ar. < Arabic fustuq	pistácio, pistacho < Lat < Gre pistacium < pistákia
cheese-flavoured roll	almojábana < Hisp. Ar. almuǧábbana < ǧubn	pão de queijo, bolinha de queijo < Lat. panis, bulla + caseus
thrush	zorzal < Hisp. Ar. < Arabic zurzál < zurzir	tordo < Lat. turdus
hobby (bird)	alcotán < Hisp. Ar. < Arabic quṭán < qaṭām	ógea < uncertain origin *maybe O.Fra. hobe
mackerel	jurel < Hisp. Ar < Lat šuríl < saurus	cavala < Gaulish < Celt . caballos
sea bream	mojarra < Ar. Hisp. < Arabic moharra < muḥárraf	dourada < Lat. < Provençal aurata, daurada
scorpion	alacrán, escorpión < His. Ar. < Arabic, Lat. al'aqráb < aqrab, scorpīo	escorpião < Lat. scorpīo
mercury	azogue, mercurio < His. Ar. < Arabic azzáwq < zāwūq	mercúrio < Lat. Mercurius
breast cancer	zaratán, cáncer de mama < Arabic, Lat. saratan, cancer mamma	cancro/câncer da mama < Lat. cancer mamma
robe (bath)	albornoz < Hisp. Ar. < Arabic burnús < burnūs	roupão, robe < Gothic, Fra. rauba, robe
hostess, stewardess	azafata < Hisp. Ar < Arabic. assafáṭ < safáṭ	hospedeira (de bordo) < Lat. hospitis
sewage (system), gutter	alcantarilla < Hisp. Ar. < Arabic alqánṭara < qánṭarah	esgoto, goteira < Lat. guttae
jerk	mamarracho < Hisp. Ar < Arabic muharráǧ < muharriǧ	parvo < Lat . parvulus
drunk, drunkard	borracho < Cat < Arabic marratxa < mirrassa	bêbado < Lat . bibitum
to crimp, to compress, to link (verb)	engarzar < Hisp. Ar. < Arabic ḡárza< ḡarzah	engrenar, endentar, comprimir < Lat. granum, dens, comprimere
to duck out, to skive off (verb)	escaquearse < Hisp. Ar. < Arabic iššáh < šāh	escapar < Lat. < Proto-Italic excappā <, kaput
to save(financial) (verb)	ahorrar < Arabic. alhurr الحر	poupar < Lat. palpō < palpāre
terrace, rooftop	azotea < Hisp. Ar. < Arabic assuṭáyḥa < saṭḥ	terraço < Provençal terrasa
oil press	almazara < Hisp. Ar. < Arabic alma‘ṣára < ma‘ṣarah	prensa de lagar < Lat. prehendĕre + de + lacus
corner, edge	rincón < Hisp. Ar. < Arabic rukán < rukn	canto < Celtic kant
flowerbed, small garden, vegetable patch	arriate < Hisp. Ar. < Arabic arriyáḍ < riyāḍ	canteiro < Celtic kant
Iraqi	iraquí, irakí < Arabic demonym iraqiyy عراقي	Iraquiano < Lat. + suffix Iraqi + -anus

Conversely, there are a few examples where a word of Arabic origin is used in Portuguese but not in Spanish, such as: Sp. romero, Port. alecrim (Port. rosmaninho or rosmarinho means 'lavender'), 'rosemary'; Sp. lechuga, Port. alface (in Port. leituga means 'catsear'), 'lettuce'; or more commonly used in Portuguese than in Spanish although the word exists in both languages, such as: chafariz 'fountain' (Port.fonte, Sp. fuente) or garrafa 'bottle' (Port. botelha, Sp. botella). In a few cases Spanish and Portuguese have both borrowed different Arabic-derived words for the same meaning, such as: Sp. alfombra, Port. alcatifa, 'carpet'; Sp. aduana, Port. alfândega, 'customs' (in Port. aduaneiro is an adjective which means 'of or relating to customs'); the latter is derived from the name of a town in Portugal that once stood on the boundary between Christendom and Islam.

Arabic is the source of a few personal given names and numerous derivative surnames and place names in Spain, including the following:

Almudena, Azucena, Guadalupe, Mohamed, Soraya, Zulema, Abenamir, Abengoa, Avengoa, Abenójar, Alcalá, Almuzara, Acebrón, Aceituno, Aceitón, Aguera, Aguiló, Alamar, Alamino, Alanzor, Albarral, Albarrán, Albo, Alborán, Albaicín, Alcantud, Alcazar, Alcudia, Alguacil, Allobar, Almaguer, Almandós, Almandoz, Almería, Almodóvar, Almoravit, Ambasil, Andujar, Aranda, Ayas, Aias, Benayas, Bardaxí, Benajara, Benameji, Benasar, Bennásar, Benavides, Bendala, Bujalance, Calatayud, Ceuta, Cid, Córdoba, Dris, Faulí, Gálvez, Godesteiz, Granada, Guadalupe, Gudiel, Hispán, Yllán, Illán, Illanes, Iznajar, Jaén, Madrid, Manzaneque, Mezquita, Mezquitas, Mudarra, Palomoque, Trujillo, Zanata, Zaratan, Zarate, Zaratin, Zegrí, Cegrí, Zorita.

==== Influences from other languages ====
Spanish and Portuguese have acquired different words from various Amerindian, African and Asian languages, as in the following examples:

- 'pineapple': Sp. piña (from the Spanish word for 'pine cone') / Port. abacaxi (from Tupi) or ananás (from Tupi–Guarani; also in Spanish, by way of Portuguese, ananás or ananá).
- 'smoking pipe': Sp. pipa (from supposed Late Latin pīpa) / Port. cachimbo (from Kimbundu).
- 'tea': Sp. té (from Min Nan Chinese) / Port. chá (from Cantonese).

Like with most European languages, both Spanish and Portuguese acquired numerous Greek words mainly related to sciences, arts and humanities:

- 'acrolith': Sp. acrolito / Port. acrólito (from Gr.'ἀκρόλιθος') /
- 'apocalypse': Sp. apocalipsis / Port. apocalipse (from Gr.'ἀποκάλυψις')/
- 'bibliography': Sp. bibliografía / Port. bibliografia (from Gr.'βιβλία biblia + γραφή graphḗ') /
- 'cemetery': Sp. cementerio / Port. cemitério (from Gr. ' κοιμητήριον koimētḗrion')
- 'chiropodist': Sp. podólogo (Gr. 'ποδης') / Port. quiropodista (from Gr. 'kheiropódes') /
- 'hermitage': Sp. lugar aislado (from Lat. locālis + insŭla) / Port. ermida, ermo (from < Gr. 'ἔρημος')
- 'ophthalmologist': Sp. oftalmólogo / Port. oftalmologista (from Gr.'ὀφθαλμός ophthalmós 'eye'+ λογία logia') /
- 'photosynthesis': Sp. fotosíntesis / Port. fotossíntese (from Gr.'φῶς + σύνθεσις' ) /
- 'psychoanalysis': Sp. psicoanálisis, sicoanálisis / Port. psicanálise from Fra. psychanalyse < (from Gr.'ψυχο psycho + ἀνάλυσις analysis') /
- 'surgeon': Sp. cirujano / Port. cirurgião (from Gr.'χειρουργία cheirourgia') /

==== Days of the week ====
Unlike the other Romance languages, modern Portuguese does not use the Roman planetary system for the days Monday through Friday. Instead, the weekdays are numerical, and derived from Ecclesiastical Latin. The word feira (from Latin fēria) refers to daily (Roman Catholic) religious celebrations; it is cognate with feira 'fair' or 'market', as well as with férias 'vacation' and feriado 'holiday'. In Spanish, the days of the week are all masculine; in Portuguese, the feira days are feminine, while sábado and domingo are masculine.

Spanish	Portuguese	English
lunes (< Lat. diēs lūnae 'Moon's day')	Segunda-feira (fēria secuda 'Second weekday')	Monday
martes (< Lat. diēs martis 'Mars' day')	Terça-feira (fēria tertia 'Third weekday')	Tuesday
miércoles (< Lat. diēs mercuriī 'Mercury's day')	Quarta-feira (fēria quarta 'Fourth weekday')	Wednesday
jueves (< Lat. diēs iovis 'Jupiter's day')	Quinta-feira (fēria quinta 'Fifth weekday')	Thursday
viernes (< Lat. diēs veneris, 'Venus' day')	Sexta-feira (fēria sexta 'Sixth weekday')	Friday
sábado (< Lat. sabbatum 'Sabbath')		Saturday
domingo (< Lat. diēs dominica 'Lord's day')		Sunday

== Grammar ==
Broadly speaking, the grammars of Portuguese and Spanish share many common features. Nevertheless, some differences between them can present hurdles to people acquainted with one and learning the other.

=== Gender ===
Spanish has three forms for the singular definite article, el, masculine, la, feminine, and lo, neuter. The last is used with adjectives to form abstract nouns employed in a generic sense, and also to intensify the meaning of adjectives. In Portuguese, there is only o, masculine, and a, feminine. Literary Spanish has also three corresponding third person pronouns, él 'he', ella 'she', and ello 'it' (referring to a broad concept, not a named object), while Portuguese has only ele, masculine, and ela, feminine. The Spanish neuters lo and ello have no plural forms.

Some words are masculine in Spanish, but feminine in Portuguese, or vice versa. A common example are nouns ended in -aje in Spanish, which are masculine, and their Portuguese cognates ending in -agem, which are feminine. For example, Spanish el viaje 'the journey' (masculine, like French le voyage and Italian il viaggio) corresponds to the Portuguese feminine a viagem. Similarly, el puente 'bridge', el dolor 'pain', or el árbol 'tree' are masculine nouns in Modern Spanish, whereas a ponte, a dor, and a árvore are feminine in Portuguese. On the other hand, the Spanish feminine la leche 'the milk' corresponds to Portuguese o leite (masculine, like French le lait, Italian il latte). Likewise, nariz 'nose' is feminine in Spanish and masculine in Portuguese.

Some Spanish words can be both masculine and feminine, with different meanings. Both meanings usually exist also in Portuguese, but with one and the same gender, so that they can't be differentiated unless further information is provided. For instance, the word orden 'order' can mean both 'harmonious arrangement' and 'directive', like its counterparts in English and Portuguese. But the Spanish word is masculine when used with the first meaning, and feminine with the second:

Me sorprendió el orden. ('I was surprised by the order [i.e., by how orderly it all was].')
Me sorprendió la orden. ('I was surprised by the order [i.e., by the directive that was given].')

In Portuguese, the equivalent word ordem is always feminine:

Me surpreendeu/Surpreendeu-me a ordem. ('I was surprised by the order.')

Without additional context, it is impossible to tell which meaning was intended in Portuguese and English (though other words could be substituted; in English, one would likely use orderliness in the first case above rather than order, which would, by itself, suggest the second case).

=== Use of the definite article ===
In many varieties of Portuguese, personal names are normally preceded by a definite article, a trait also found in Catalan. In Portuguese, this is a relatively recent development, which some Brazilian dialects have not adopted yet, most notably in some states of the Brazilian Northeast. In those dialects of Portuguese that do regularly use definite articles before proper nouns, the article may be omitted for extra formality, or to show distance in a literary narrative. Compare, for example, English "Mary left", Spanish María salió, and Portuguese A Maria saiu. Note, however, that in many Spanish dialects the definite article is used before personal names; thus, la María salió is commonly heard.

Portuguese uses the definite article before the names of some cities and almost all countries except relatively new ones, such as Cingapura/Singapura ('Singapore'), and those related to Portugal (or with which Portugal has historical relationships, even though this is a rough rule) and the Portuguese-speaking countries, e.g., a Holanda but Portugal; o México but Angola, a Suécia, but Moçambique. The major exception to the country rule is o Brasil. In Spanish, use of the definite article is optional with some countries: (la) China, (el) Japón, (la) India, (la) Argentina, (el) Ecuador, (el) Perú, (el) Uruguay, (el) Paraguay, (el) Brasil, (los) Estados Unidos, etc. The same is true with two continents: (la) Antártida and (el) África; with archipelagos and islands: (las) Filipinas, (las) Canarias, (las) Azores, with some provinces, regions or territories: (el) Tíbet, (la) Toscana, (el) Piamonte, (el) Lacio and with some cities: (el) Cairo, (la) Valeta. Spanish uses the definite article with all geographical names when they appear with an adjective or modifying phrase, as in the following examples: la España medieval 'medieval Spain', el Puerto Rico prehispánico 'pre-Hispanic Puerto Rico', el Portugal de Salazar 'Portugal during Salazar's dictatorship', etc.

Santiago es la capital de Chile. (Spanish)
Santiago é a capital do Chile. (Portuguese)
'Santiago is the capital of Chile.'

Él es de Costa Rica, que está en América Central. (Spanish)
Ele é da Costa Rica, que fica na América Central. (Portuguese)
'He is from Costa Rica, which is in Central America.'

Tengo un boleto para (los) Estados Unidos de América. (Spanish)
Tenho um bilhete para os Estados Unidos da América. (Portuguese)
'I have a ticket to the United States of America.'

Nueva Delhi no es la ciudad más poblada de (la) India. (Spanish)
Nova Déli não é a cidade mais populosa da Índia. (Portuguese)
'New Delhi is not the most populous city in India.'

La Europa medieval pertenecía a monarcas absolutos. (Spanish)
A Europa medieval pertencia a monarcas absolutos. (Portuguese)
'Medieval Europe belonged to absolute monarchs.'

Portuguese omits the definite article in stating the time of day unless para as is used.

Son las nueve y cuarto, but also Son nueve y quince or Son nueve quince. (Spanish)
São (as) nove (horas) e quinze (minutos). (Portuguese) (parenthesical parts often omitted)
'It's nine fifteen.' Or:'It's a quarter past/after nine.'

In addition, in most dialects of Portuguese the definite article is used before possessive adjectives (as it is used in Italian), which is not possible in Spanish. For instance, the sentence 'This is my brother' is Este es mi hermano in Spanish, but may be Este é o meu irmão in Portuguese. Nevertheless, in many Brazilian dialects (mostly in the Northeast) and in casual Brazilian Portuguese the article is not used in sentences such as: Este é meu irmão (although it usually reappears in sentences such as "O meu irmão está lá").

=== Possessives ===
In Portuguese, possessive adjectives have the same form as possessive pronouns, and they all agree with the gender of the possessed item. In Spanish, the same is true of nuestro/nuestra ("our") and vuestro/vuestra ("your" [plural]), but for all other possessives, the pronoun has a longer form that agrees with the gender of the possessed item, while the adjective has a shorter form that does not change for gender. The possessive adjectives are normally preceded by a definite article in Continental Portuguese, less so in Brazilian Portuguese, and never in Spanish. The possessive pronouns are preceded by a definite article in all dialects of both languages. See examples in the table below.

Gender of possessed item	Spanish		Portuguese	
Gender of possessed item	Adjective	Pronoun	Adjective	Pronoun
Feminine	tu/su casa "your house"	la tuya/la suya "yours"	(a) tua/(a) sua casa "your house"	a tua/a sua "yours"
Masculine	tu/su libro "your book"	el tuyo/el suyo "yours"	(o) teu/(o) seu livro "your book"	o teu/o seu "yours"

=== Pronouns ===
==== Object pronouns ====
In Portuguese, third-person clitic pronouns have special variants used after certain types of verb endings, which does not happen in Spanish. The default object pronouns o/a/os/as change to lo/la/los/las when they follow a verb that ends in ⟨r⟩, ⟨s⟩ or ⟨z⟩, and to no/na/nos/nas when they follow a verb that ends in a nasal sound.

Spanish	Portuguese	Meaning
manténgalo	mantenha-o	'keep it'
mantenerlo	mantê-lo	'to keep it'
lo mantienen	mantêm-no	'they keep it'

In Brazilian Portuguese, these forms are uncommon, since the pronoun normally precedes the verb (i.e., você o mantenha in the above example), and third-person subject pronouns are used informally as object pronouns (mantenha ele). However, as it has been considered ungrammatical to begin a sentence with an object pronoun, the above examples are, on rare occasion, used in Brazil as well.

==== Clitic personal pronouns ====
European Portuguese differs from Brazilian Portuguese with regard to the placement of clitic personal pronouns, and Spanish is in turn different from both of them.

- In Spanish, clitic pronouns normally come before the verb, except with the imperative, the infinitive, and the gerund. In verbal periphrases, they precede the auxiliary verb.
- In spoken Brazilian Portuguese, clitic pronouns normally come before the main verb. In verbal periphrases, they come between the auxiliary verb and the main verb. This occurs even with the imperative, the infinitive, the gerund, and the past participle.
- In European Portuguese, clitic pronouns may come before or after the verb, depending on the type of clause. In verbal periphrases, they may precede or follow the auxiliary verb, or follow the main verb (when this is in the infinitive or the gerund).

Spanish	Portuguese	Meaning
Ella le dio un libro.	Ela deu-lhe um livro. Ela lhe deu um livro.	'She gave him/her a book.'
Dígame dónde ha estado. Dime dónde has estado.	Diga-me por onde esteve. Diz-me onde estiveste. Me diga por onde esteve. Me diz onde estiveste.	'Tell me where you've been.'
Hazme una foto.	Tira-me uma foto. Me tira uma foto.	'Take a picture for me.'
Quería verte. Te quería ver.	Queria ver-te. Queria te ver. Te queria ver.	'I wanted to see you.'
No te he conseguido ver. No he conseguido verte. No conseguí verte.	Não consegui ver-te. Não consegui te ver. Não te consegui ver.	'I didn't manage to see you.'

==== Mesoclisis ====
In Portuguese, verbs in the future indicative or conditional tense may be split into morphemes, and the clitic pronoun can be inserted between them, a feature known as mesoclisis. This also occurred in Old Spanish, but no comparable phenomenon takes place in modern Spanish:

Lo traerá. (Spanish)
Trá-lo-á. (European Portuguese and formal written Brazilian Portuguese)
'He/She will bring it.'

However, these tenses are often replaced with others in the spoken language. Future indicative is sometimes replaced by present indicative; conditional is very often replaced by imperfect indicative. In colloquial language, most Portuguese would state trá-lo-á as vai trazê-lo ('going to bring it') or irá trazê-lo ('will bring it'). In Brazilian Portuguese, "vai trazer ele" would be the vernacular use.

==== Combining pronouns in Spanish ====
The Spanish construction, se lo dio, means either '[He/She] gave it to [him/her]' or '[He/She] gave it to himself/herself'. The expected pattern for the former would be *le lo dio, but such a construction does not exist. This is unique to Spanish.

- Latin: dedit illī illud → dedit illī illum (early Vulgar Latin) → dit illi illu (Late Vulgar Latin)
- Spanish: dio (i)lli (el)lo → dio ge lo → diógelo (arch.) → dióselo → se lo dio
- Portuguese: deu (i)lli (l)o → deu lhe (l)o → deu-lho

Thus, modern Spanish makes no distinction between the reflexive pronoun se and the dative personal pronoun se, whereas in Portuguese it would be "deu-so" for the reflexive pronoun and "deu-lho" for the dative case. Note that this did not happen in old Spanish: diógelo, 'he gave it to him', dióselo, 'he gave it to himself'. The medieval g sound (similar to that of French) was replaced with s in the 14th-15th centuries (cf. Spanish coger, 'to catch', but cosecha, 'harvest', Port. colher and colheita, both from Lat. colligere).

==== Use of stressed pronouns for inanimate subjects ====
In standard Spanish, stressed pronouns in the subject position are never used for inanimate subjects (i.e., things, as opposed to people or animals), not even for clarity or disambiguation purposes, except when modified by an attribute (él solito may mean 'he by himself' or 'it by itself'). Portuguese knows no such restriction, so that stressed pronouns referring to inanimate subjects can either be used or dropped:

¿Dónde están las llaves? (Están) En la mesa. (Spanish – pronoun should be dropped, not *Ellas están...; verb is often dropped)
O que é das chaves?/ Cadê as chaves? (Elas estão) Na mesa. (Portuguese – pronoun and verb are optional, the verb can be used without the pronoun: Estão...)
'Where are the keys? (They are) On the table.' (English – pronoun and verb are not necessarily required, but the verb requires the pronoun, not *Are...)

==== Second-person pronouns ====
The use of second-person pronouns differs dramatically between Spanish and Portuguese, and even more so between European and Brazilian Portuguese. Spanish tú and usted correspond etymologically to Portuguese tu and você, but Portuguese has gained a third, even more formal form o(s) senhor(es), a(s) senhora(s), demoting você to an "equalizing" rather than respectful register. The old familiar forms have been largely lost in the Portuguese-speaking world, as the Portuguese equalizing forms você or vocês have displaced tu to a large extent and vós almost entirely; and even where tu is still used, the second-person verb forms that historically corresponded to it are often replaced by the same (third-person) forms that are used with "você".

In the plural, Portuguese familiar vós is archaic nearly everywhere (as with the old English second singular "thou"), and both the subject pronoun and its corresponding second-person plural verb forms are generally limited to the Bible, traditional prayers, and spoken varieties of certain regions of rural Portugal; normally, the familiar (and equalizing) form is now vocês, although in Portugal the second person plural forms are retained for both object and possessive pronouns (e.g., vocês e a vossa família). In the case of northern and central Peninsular Spanish, tú, usted, vosotros, and ustedes have more or less kept their original functions; if anything, tú is displacing usted out of common use and usted is coming to be used only for formal situations (like o senhor in Portuguese). Latin American Spanish is more complicated: vosotros has fallen out of use in favor of ustedes, but certain regions of Spanish America also use vos as a singular informal pronoun, displacing tú out of its original role to a greater or lesser extent (see voseo).

Spoken Brazilian Portuguese has dramatically simplified the pronoun system, with você(s) tending to displace all other forms. Although a few parts of Brazil still use tu and the corresponding second-person singular verb forms, most areas either use tu with third-person verb forms or (increasingly) drop tu entirely in favor of você. This has in turn caused the original third-person possessive seu, sua to shift to primarily second-person use, alongside the appearance of a new third-person possessive dele, dela (plural deles, delas, "their") that follows the noun (thus paraphrases such as o carro dele "his car", o carro dela "her car"). The formal o senhor is also increasingly restricted to certain situations, such as that of a storekeeper addressing a customer, or a child or teenager addressing an adult stranger.

More conservative in this regard is the fluminense dialect of Brazilian Portuguese (spoken in Rio de Janeiro, Espírito Santo and in the Zona da Mata of the state of Minas Gerais) – especially its carioca sociolect. This dialect generally preserves intimate or familiar tu, the standard equalizing form você, and the respectful or formal o senhor/a senhora, together with their related possessives, to such an extent that almost all speakers use these forms, according to context. Nevertheless, a minority of educated speakers correctly conjugates all of the tu pronouns formally; otherwise, it is mostly conjugated as você.

Standard Portuguese usage has vocês and os senhores/as senhoras as plurals of você and o senhor/a senhora, but the vernacular has also produced new forms with the second-person familiar plural function, such as gente (compare a gente as a possible colloquial variation of nós, "we"/"us", that should be conjugated—but commonly is not—as third-person singular), pessoas, pessoal, [meu] povo, cês (eye dialect for vocês in colloquial pronunciation), and galera (the latter mainly associated with youth slang).

It is often said that the gaúcho, nordestino and amazofonia dialects, as well as some sociolects elsewhere, such as that in and around the city of Santos, have preserved tu; but unlike in fluminense, the use of você is very limited, and entirely absent among some speakers, and tu takes its place. In these areas, the verb with tu is conjugated in the third-person form (as with você) – except among educated speakers in some urban centers such as Porto Alegre and, especially, Belém. See Brazilian Portuguese.

=== Verbs ===
==== "To be" ====
Spanish and Portuguese have two main copulas, ser and estar. For the most part, the use of these verbs is the same in both languages, but there are a few cases where it differs. The main difference between Spanish and Portuguese is in the interpretation of the concept of state versus essence and in the generalizations one way or another that are made in certain constructions. For instance,

Está prohibido fumar. (Spanish) [estar]
É proibido fumar. (Portuguese) [ser]
'Smoking is forbidden.'

La silla está hecha de madera. (Spanish) [estar]
A cadeira é feita de madeira. (Portuguese) [ser]
'The chair is made of wood.'

Sólo uno es correcto. (Spanish) [ser]
Só um está correcto. (Portuguese) [estar]
'Only one is correct.'

Also, the use of ser regarding a permanent location is much more accepted in Portuguese. Conversely, estar is often permanent in Spanish regarding a location, while in Portuguese, it implies being temporary or something within the immediate vicinity (same house, building, etc.)

Nuestra oficina queda (or está) muy lejos. (Spanish) [quedar/estar]
O nosso escritório é (or fica) muito longe. (Portuguese) [ser/ficar]
'Our office is very far away.'

¿Dónde está (or queda) el aeropuerto? (Spanish) [estar/quedar]
Onde fica (or é) o aeroporto? (Portuguese) [ficar/ser]
'Where is the airport?'

Because the airport is obviously not anywhere nearby, ficar is used in Portuguese (most common), though ser can also be used.

Secondary copulas are quedar(se) in Spanish and ficar in Portuguese. Each can also mean 'to stay' or 'to remain.'

Me quedé dentro de la casa todo el día. (Spanish)
Fiquei dentro de casa todo o dia. (Portuguese)
'I stayed inside the house all day.'

The Spanish sentence using the reflexive form of the verb (quedarse) implies that staying inside the house was voluntary, while Portuguese and English are quite ambiguous on this matter without any additional context. (See also the next section.)

Both Spanish quedar(se) and Portuguese ficar can mean 'become':

Mi abuela se está quedando sorda. (Spanish)
(A) Minha avó está ficando surda. (Brazilian Portuguese and some dialects of European Portuguese)
(A) minha avó está a ficar surda. (European Portuguese)
'My grandmother is becoming deaf.'

==== Reflexive verbs ====
Reflexive verbs are somewhat more frequent in Spanish than in Portuguese, especially with actions relating to parts of the body:

Guillermo se quebró la pierna jugando al fútbol. (Spanish)
(O) Guilherme quebrou(-se) a perna jogando futebol. (Brazilian Portuguese)
(O) Guilherme partiu a perna a jogar futebol. (European Portuguese)
'Guilherme broke his leg playing soccer.'

==== "To like" ====
The Portuguese and Spanish verbs for expressing "liking" are similar in form (gostar and gustar respectively) but different in their arrangement of arguments. Arguments in linguistics are expressions that enable a verb to complete its meaning. Expressions of liking typically require two arguments: (1) a person who likes something (sometimes called the "experiencer"), and (2) something that the person likes (sometimes called the "theme"). Portuguese and Spanish (as well as English) assign different grammatical cases to these arguments, as shown in the following table:

Argument structure with verbs of liking
	Person who likes	Thing that is liked	Form
Portuguese	Subject	Object of preposition de	(Eu) gosto de música.
Spanish	Indirect object	Subject	Me gusta la música.
English	Subject	Direct object	I like music.

The Portuguese sentence can be translated literally as "[I] [take satisfaction] [from] [the music]", while the Spanish corresponds to "[To me] [(it) is pleasing] [the music]."

It is also possible in Spanish to express it as: "(Yo) gusto de la música", although this use has become antiquated.

==== Auxiliary verbs with the perfect ====
In Spanish, the compound perfect is constructed with the auxiliary verb haber (< Latin habēre). Although Portuguese used to use its cognate verb (haver) in this way, now it is more common to form these tenses with ter ('to have') (< Latin tenēre). While ter is occasionally used as an auxiliary by other Iberian languages, it is much more pervasive in Portuguese - to the extent that most Portuguese verb tables only list ter with regard to the perfect.

Yo ya hube comido cuando mi madre volvió. (Spanish) [perfect form of haber]
Yo ya había comido cuando mi madre volvió. (Spanish) [imperfect form of haber]
Eu já comera quando a minha mãe voltou. (Portuguese) [pluperfect inherited from Latin]
Eu já tinha comido quando a minha mãe voltou. (Portuguese) [imperfect form of ter]
Eu já havia comido quando a minha mãe voltou. (Portuguese) [imperfect form of haver]
'I had already eaten when my mother returned.'

==== Imperfect subjunctive versus pluperfect indicative ====
A class of false friends between the two languages is composed of the verb forms with endings containing -ra-, such as cantara, cantaras, cantáramos, and so on. Spanish has two forms for the imperfect subjunctive, one with endings in -se- and another with endings in -ra- (e.g., cantase/cantara 'were I to sing'), which are usually interchangeable. In Portuguese, only cantasse has this value; cantara is employed as a pluperfect indicative, i.e., the equivalent to Spanish había cantado ('I had sung'). Although there is a strong tendency to use a verb phrase instead in the spoken language, like in Spanish and English (havia cantado), the simple tense is still frequent in literature.

==== Present perfect ====
In European Spanish, as well as some Andean dialects, as in English, the present perfect is normally used to talk about an action initiated and completed in the past, which is still considered relevant or influential in the present moment. In Portuguese and Latin American Spanish, the same meaning is conveyed by the simple preterite, as in the examples below:

No, gracias. Ya he cenado. (Spanish, Spain) [present perfect]
No, gracias. Ya cené. (Spanish, Latin America) [preterite]
Não, obrigado. Já jantei. (Portuguese) [preterite]
'No, thank you. I have already dined.' [present perfect]

He ido a España dos veces. (Spanish, Spain) [present perfect]
Fui a España dos veces. (Spanish, Latin America) [preterite]
Fui à Espanha duas vezes. (Portuguese) [preterite]
'I have been to Spain twice.' [present perfect]

¿Ha oído usted las últimas noticias, señor? (Spanish, Spain) [present perfect]
¿Oyó usted las últimas noticias, señor? (Spanish, Latin America) [preterite]
O senhor ouviu as últimas notícias? (Portuguese) [preterite]
'Have you heard the latest news, sir?' [present perfect]

Portuguese normally uses the present perfect (pretérito perfeito composto) for speaking of an event that began in the past, was repeated regularly up to the present, and could keep happening in the future. See the contrast with Spanish in the following example:

He pensado en pedirle matrimonio. (Spanish) [present perfect]
'I have thought of asking her/him [indirect object] to marry me [the thought has occurred to me at least once].' [present perfect]
Tenho pensado em pedi-la em casamento. (Portuguese) [present perfect]
'I have been thinking of asking her [direct object] to marry me.' [present perfect continuous]

As this example suggests, the Portuguese present perfect is often closer in meaning to the English present perfect continuous. See also Spanish verbs: Contrasting the preterite and the perfect.

==== Personal infinitive ====
Portuguese, uniquely among the major Romance languages, has acquired a "personal infinitive", which can be used as an alternative to a subordinate clause with a finite verb in the subjunctive.

A recepcionista pediu para esperarmos. (Portuguese) [personal infinitive]
A recepcionista pediu que esperássemos. (Portuguese) [imperfect subjunctive]
La recepcionista nos pidió que esperáramos/esperásemos. (Spanish) [imperfect subjunctive]
'The receptionist asked for us to wait.' (literal personal infinitive translation)
'The receptionist asked that we wait.' (literal Portuguese imperfect subjunctive translation)

The Portuguese perfect form of the personal infinitive corresponds to one of several possible Spanish finite verbs.

Alguém nos acusou de termos roubado uma caneta. (Portuguese)
Alguien nos acusó de haber robado un bolígrafo. (Spanish)
'Somebody accused us of having stolen a pen.'

On some occasions, the personal infinitive can hardly be replaced by a finite clause and corresponds to a different structure in Spanish (and English):

O hábito de fumares à janela é desagradável. (Portuguese, using personal infinitive. Literally, 'The habit of [you] smoking at the window is unpleasant.')
(O) teu hábito de fumar à janela é desagradável. (Portuguese, using impersonal infinitive. Literally, '(The) Your habit of smoking at the window is unpleasant.')
Tu hábito de fumar en la ventana es desagradable. (Spanish: 'Your habit of smoking at the window is unpleasant.')

The personal infinitive is not used in counterfactual situations, as these require either the future subjunctive or the imperfect subjunctive. 'If we were/had been rich...' is Se fôssemos ricos..., not *Se sermos ricos... Also, it is conjugated the same as the future subjunctive (see next section), provided the latter is not irregular (ser, estar, ter, etc.) The personal infinitive is never irregular, though the circumflex accent may be dropped in writing on expanded forms (such as pôr).

In the first and third person singular, the personal infinitive appears no different from the unconjugated infinitive.

É bom eu/ele esperar um bocadinho. (Portuguese)
'It is good that I/he wait(s) a bit.'

The above rules also apply whenever the subjects of the two clauses are the same, but independent of each other.

Para chegarmos cedo, temos/teremos que nos apressar. (Portuguese) [personal infinitive]
Para que lleguemos temprano, necesitamos apresurarnos. (Spanish) [present subjunctive]
'For us to arrive early, we will need to hurry.'

Para chegarmos cedo, tínhamos/teríamos que nos apressar. (Portuguese) [personal infinitive]
Para que llegáramos/llegásemos temprano, necesitaríamos apresurarnos. (Spanish) [imperfect subjunctive]
'For us to arrive early, we would need to hurry.'

As shown, the personal infinitive can be used at times to replace both the impersonal infinitive and the subjunctive. Spanish has no such alternative.

==== Future subjunctive ====
The future subjunctive, now virtually obsolete in Spanish, or circumscribed to legal documents, continues in use in both written and spoken Portuguese. It is used in subordinate clauses referring to a hypothetical future event or state – either adverbial clauses (usually introduced by se 'if ' or quando 'when') or adjective clauses that modify nouns referring to a hypothetical future entity. Spanish, in the analogous if-clauses, uses the present indicative, and in the cuando- and adjective clauses uses the present subjunctive.

Se eu for eleito presidente, mudarei a lei. (Portuguese)
Si yo soy (also fuere) elegido presidente, cambiaré la ley. (Spanish)
'If I am elected president, I will change the law.'

Quando fores mais velho, compreenderás/hás-de compreender. (Portuguese)
Cuando seas (also fueres) mayor, comprenderás. (Spanish)
'When you are older, you'll understand.'

Dar-se-á/Se dará o prémio à primeira pessoa que disser a resposta correta. (Portuguese)
Se dará el premio a la primera persona que diga (also dijere) la respuesta correcta. (Spanish)
'The prize will be given to the first person who says the right answer.'

==== Irregular verbs ====
In the preterite tense, a number of irregular verbs in Portuguese change the stem vowel to indicate differences between first and third person singular: fiz 'I did' vs. fez 'he did', pude 'I could' vs. pôde 'he could', fui 'I was' vs. foi 'he was', tive 'I had' vs. teve 'he had', etc. Historically, these vowel differences are due to vowel raising (metaphony) triggered by the final -ī of the first-person singular in Latin. Spanish maintains such a difference only in fui 'I was' vs. fue 'he was'. In all other cases in Spanish, the stem vowel has been regularized throughout the conjugation and a new third-person ending -o adopted: hice 'I did' vs. hizo 'he did', pude 'I could' vs. pudo 'he could', etc. Portuguese verbs ending in -duzir are regular in the preterite, while their Spanish counterparts in -ducir undergo a consonant change and are stressed on the stem; thus Portuguese reduzi vs. Spanish reduje ('I reduced'). Similarly, the preterite of andar is regular in Portuguese (andaste), but irregular in Spanish (anduviste, 'you went').

Meanwhile, Spanish maintains many more irregular forms in the future and conditional: saldré 'I will leave', pondré 'I will put', vendré 'I will come', diré 'I will say', etc. Portuguese has only three: farei 'I will do', direi 'I will say', trarei 'I will carry'.

Portuguese drops -e in "irregular" third-person singular present indicative forms after ⟨z⟩ and ⟨r⟩, according to phonological rules: faz 'he does', diz 'he says', quer 'he wants', etc. Spanish has restored -e by analogy with other verbs: hace 'he does', dice 'he says', quiere 'he wants', etc. (The same type of analogy accounts for fiz vs hice 'I did' in the past tense. In nouns such as paz 'peace', luz 'light', amor 'love', etc. -e was dropped in both languages and never restored).

=== Prepositions ===
==== Contractions ====
In Spanish the prepositions a ('to') and de ('of, from') form contractions with a following masculine singular definite article (el 'the'): a + el > al, and de + el > del. This kind of contraction is much more extensive in Portuguese, involving the prepositions a ('to'), de ('of, from'), em ('in'), and por ('for') with articles and demonstratives regardless of number or gender. All four of these prepositions join with the definite article, as shown in the following table:

Preposition + definite article (Portuguese)	a	de	em	por
o (masc.sing.)	ao	do	no ^{1}	pelo^{2}
a (fem.sing.)	à ^{3}	da	na	pela
os (masc.pl.)	aos	dos ^{1}	nos^{2}	pelos
as (fem.pl.)	às	das	nas	pelas

^{1}These Portuguese contractions include some potential "false friends" for the reader of Spanish, such as no (Port. 'in the', Sp. 'no, not') and dos (Port. 'of the', Sp. 'two').
^{2}These Portuguese contractions have different meanings in Spanish, but their Portuguese cognates are spelled with diacritics; pelo (Port. 'for the', Sp. 'hair' (equivalent to Port. pêlo)) and nos (Port. 'in the', Sp. 'ourselves' (equivalent to Port. nós)).
^{3}In European Portuguese, a is pronounced [ɐ], while à is pronounced [a]. Both are generally [a] in most of Brazil, although in some accents such as carioca and florianopolitano there may be distinction.

Additionally, the prepositions de and em combine with the demonstrative adjectives and pronouns as shown below:

Preposition + demonstrative (Portuguese)	de	em
este (masc.sing.) esta (fem.sing.) estes (masc.pl.) estas (fem.pl.)	deste desta destes destas	neste nesta nestes nestas
esse (masc.sing.) essa (fem.sing.) esses (masc.pl.) essas (fem.pl.)	desse dessa desses dessas	nesse nessa nesses nessas
aquele (masc.sing.) aquela (fem.sing.) aqueles (masc.pl.) aquelas (fem.pl.)	daquele daquela daqueles daquelas	naquele naquela naqueles naquelas

The neuter demonstrative pronouns (isto 'this' isso, aquilo 'that') likewise combine with de and em – thus, disto, nisto, etc. And the preposition a combines with the "distal" demonstratives (those that begin with a-) to form àquele, àquilo, etc.

The Portuguese contractions mentioned thus far are obligatory. Contractions can also be optionally formed from em and de with the indefinite article (um, uma, uns, umas), resulting in num, numa, dum, duma, etc. and from the third person pronouns (ele, ela, eles, elas), resulting in nele, nela, dele, dela, etc. Other optional contractions include de with aqui > daqui ('from here').

The Spanish con ('with', com in Portuguese) combines with the prepositional pronouns mí, ti, and sí to form conmigo, contigo, consigo ('with me', 'with you', 'with him-/herself '). In Portuguese this process not only applies to the pronouns mim, ti, and si (giving comigo, contigo, and consigo), but also is extended to nós and, in those varieties which use it, vós, producing connosco (conosco in Brazilian Portuguese) and convosco.

==== Personal "a" ====
Spanish employs a preposition, the so-called "personal a", before the direct object of a transitive verb (except tener) when it denotes a specific person(s), or domestic pet; thus Veo a Juan 'I see John'; Hemos invitado a los estudiantes 'We've invited the students.' In Portuguese, personal a is virtually non-existent, except before Deus 'God': louvar a Deus 'to praise God', amar a Deus 'to love God'.

==== Ir a versus ir para ====
Quite common in both languages are the prepositions a (which often translates as "to") and para (which often translates as "for"). However, European Portuguese and Spanish distinguish between going somewhere for a short while versus a longer stay, especially if it is an intended destination, in the latter case using para instead of a. While there is no specified duration of stay before a European Portuguese speaker must switch prepositions, a implies one will return sooner, rather than later, relative to the context. This distinction is not made in English and Brazilian Portuguese. In Spanish the distinction is not made if the duration is given in the context (maybe implicitly), and in this case a is generally preferred.

Fui al mercado cerca de mi casa. (Spanish)
Fui ao mercado perto de/da minha casa./Fui para o mercado perto de/da minha casa. (European and Brazilian Portuguese)
'I went to the market near my house.' [temporary displacement]

El presidente anterior fue exiliado a Portugal. (Spanish)
O presidente anterior foi exilado para Portugal. (European and Brazilian Portuguese)
'The former president was exiled to Portugal.' [permanent, or more lasting displacement]

Note, though, in the first example, para could be used in Portuguese if in contrast to a very brief period of time.

Não fico muito tempo, só um minuto. Tenho que/de ir para o mercado. (Portuguese)
'I can't stay long, only a minute. I have to go to the market.' [pending task or appointment]

In informal, non-standard Brazilian Portuguese, em (in its original form or combined with a given article in a contraction, yielding no, na, numa, etc.), often replaces the preposition a from standard Portuguese.

Vou na padaria. (non-standard Brazilian Portuguese)
Vou à padaria. (standard Portuguese)
'I'm going to the bakery.'

Fui numa festa ontem. (non-standard Brazilian Portuguese)
Fui a uma festa ontem. (standard Portuguese)
'I went to a party yesterday.'

Such a construction is not used in Spanish or in European Portuguese.

In Portuguese the preposition até can also be used when the duration of the stay is expected to be short or when there is a specific reason for going somewhere. In Spanish hasta has the same meaning and function.

Vou até à praia.
Voy hasta la playa.
'I'm going to the beach.'

==== Hacia and para ====
Spanish has two prepositions of direction: para ('for', including 'headed for [a destination]') and hacia ('toward [not necessarily implying arrival]'). Of them, only para exists in Portuguese, covering both meanings.

Este regalo es para ti. (Spanish)
Este presente é para ti. (Portuguese)
'This gift is for you.'

Aquel/Ese avión va hacia Brasilia. (Spanish)
Aquele avião voa para Brasília. (Portuguese)
'That airplane is flying toward Brasília.'

Colloquially, para is often reduced in both languages: to pa in Spanish, and to pra (sometimes written p'ra and this form may be used in literature) or pa (only in slang in Portugal and Rio de Janeiro, and not permitted in writing) in Portuguese. Portuguese pra, in turn, may join with the definite article: pra + o > pro (BP) or prò (EP), pra + a > pra (BP) or prà (EP), etc. In reference to the slang option pa, these become: pa + o > pò, pa + a > pà, etc.

==== "Going to" future ====
Both languages have a construction similar to the English "going-to" future. Spanish includes the preposition a between the conjugated form of ir "to go" and the infinitive: Vamos a cantar "We're going to sing" or "Let's sing" (present tense of ir + a + infinitive). Usually, in Portuguese, there is no preposition between the helping verb and the main verb: Vamos cantar (present tense of ir + infinitive). This also applies when the verb is in other tenses:

Ayer yo iba a leer el libro, pero no tuve la oportunidad. (Spanish)
Ontem eu ia ler o livro, mas não tive a oportunidade. (Portuguese)
Yesterday I was going to read the book, but never had the chance.

==== Other differences in preposition usage ====
While as a rule the same prepositions are used in the same contexts in both languages, there are many exceptions.

Nuestros gastos de energía. (Spanish)
(Os) nossos gastos com/de energia. (Portuguese)
Our energy expenses.

Voy a votar por/a Juan. (Spanish)
Vou votar em/no João. (Portuguese)
I'm going to vote for John.

== Orthography ==
=== Alphabet ===
The traditional Spanish alphabet had 28 letters, while the Portuguese one had 23. Modern versions of recent years added k and w (found only in foreign words) to both languages. Portuguese also added y for loanwords.

With the reform in 1994 by the 10th congress of the Association of Spanish Language Academies, Spanish alphabetization now follows the same pattern as that of other major West European languages. Prior to this date, however, the digraphs ch and ll were independently alphabetized. For example, the following surnames would be put in this order: Cervantes, Contreras, Cruz, Chávez, Dávila. Many Spanish dictionaries and other reference material still exist using the pre-reform rule of alphabetization.

Current Spanish alphabet (Spanish alphabet reform of 1994)

a b c d e f g h i j k l m n ñ o p q r s t u v w x y z

Digraphs

ch ll rr gu qu

Current Portuguese alphabet (Portuguese Language Orthographic Agreement of 1990) introducing k, w and y

a b c d e f g h i j k l m n o p q r s t u v w x y z

Digraphs

ch lh nh rr gu qu ss (sc sç xc xs)

⟨Sc⟩ in Latin American Spanish is not called a digraph, however it is a single sound as in Brazilian Portuguese. Also Spanish has taken ⟨sh⟩ /ʃ/ from English as a loan sound; e.g., sherpa, show, flash (however, the Royal Spanish Academy prescribes these words to be written in italics, as unadapted foreign words). Brazilian Portuguese uses the trigraph ⟨tch⟩ /tʃ/ for loanwords; e.g., tchau, 'ciao', tcheco 'Czech', República Tcheca 'Czech Republic', tchê 'che' (this latter is regional), etc. European Portuguese normally replace the trigraph ⟨tch⟩ with ⟨ch⟩ /ʃ/: chau, checo, República Checa, etc. (This is pronounced /tʃ/ in northern European Portuguese dialects.)

Both Spanish and Portuguese use ⟨zz⟩ /ts/ (never as /dz/ – this sequence appears only in loanwords from Japanese, e.g., adzuki) for some Italian loanwords, but in Portuguese may sometimes not be pronounced as affricate, but having an epenthetic /i/ or /ɨ/; e.g., Sp. and Port. pizza 'pizza', Sp. and Port. paparazzo 'paparazzo', etc. (however, the Royal Spanish Academy prescribes these words to be written in italics). Spanish also utilizes ⟨tz⟩ /ts/ for Basque, Catalan and Nahuatl loanwords, and ⟨tl⟩ /tɬ/ (or /tl/) for Nahuatl loanwords; e.g., Ertzaintza, quetzal, xoloitzcuintle, Tlaxcala, etc. Portuguese utilizes ⟨ts⟩ for German, originarily ⟨z⟩, and Japanese loanwords.

Although the letters k, w, and y are now included in the Portuguese alphabet, according to the current orthographic rules they should only be used in proper names (foreign or invented) and their derivatives with suffixes (kantiano, darwinismo, byroniano, etc.), and also in international symbols. Derivatives without suffixes are generally adapted to the Portuguese spelling (Karakul but caracul, Zika but zica), except measurement units (watt, henry; note also kwanza, the monetary unit of Angola). On the other hand, the current Spanish orthography allows k and w to be used in any kind of loanwords, although in some cases alternative spellings are allowed (kimono or quimono). This leads to differences in Spanish and Portuguese spellings of loanwords:

Spanish: búnker, chikunguña, karaoke, kárate/karate, karma, kilogramo, kilómetro, kiwi, koala, sándwich, wiski/güisqui, zika. Portuguese: búnquer, chicungunha, caraoquê, caraté/caratê, carma, quilograma, quilómetro/quilômetro, quivi/quiuí, coala, sanduíche, uísque, zica.

In practice, foreign words are often left unchanged in both languages, e. g. whisky, chikungunya. The Royal Spanish Academy accepts such spellings, but only with typographical emphasis: italics in printed text, quotation marks in manuscript or when italics are not available.

On the other hand, names of measurement units named after people are written unchanged in Portuguese, but Spanish often uses adapted spellings ending in -io:

Portuguese: watt, henry, hertz. Spanish: vatio, henrio, hercio.

The silent letter h is used in Spanish word-initially and word-medially (hombre, prohibir), but in Portuguese it is used only word-initially (homem but proibir). Word-final h is used in both languages in interjections (ah, oh); in Spanish it is used also in the loanword sah (which corresponds to Portuguese xá).

=== Question and exclamation marks ===
Only in Spanish do interrogatives and exclamations use the question mark or exclamation point respectively at the beginning of a sentence. The same punctuation marks are used, but these are inverted. This prepares the reader in advance for either a question or exclamation type of sentence.

Interrogative: ¿Cuántos años tienes? (Spanish)
Exclamation: ¡Cuidado con el perro! (Spanish)

On the other hand, in Portuguese, a person reading aloud lengthy sentences from an unfamiliar text may have to scan ahead to check if what at first appears to be a statement, is actually a question. Otherwise, it would be too late to enable proper voice inflection. Neither language has the equivalent of the auxiliary verb to do, which is often used to begin a question in English. Both Spanish and English can place the verb before the subject noun to indicate a question, though this is uncommon in Portuguese, and almost unheard of in Brazil. In fact, most yes/no questions in Portuguese are written the same as a statement except for the final question mark.

Spanish: ¿Tiene usted una medida de cuál es su exposición a estos riesgos, y está usted confiado de que su organización está minimizando el impacto de los mismos sobre sus accionistas, equipo de trabajo y otros grupos interesados?

Portuguese: Você tem ideia de qual é a sua exposição a esses riscos, e tem confiança que a sua organização está minimizando os impactos resultantes, nos seus acionistas, funcionários e outros interessados?

English: 'Do you have a measure of what your exposure is to these risks, and are you confident that your organization is minimizing their impact on your shareholders, staff, and other interested parties?'

Aside from changes of punctuation in written language, in speech, converting any of the above examples from a question to a statement would involve changes of both intonation and syntax in English and Spanish, but intonation only in Portuguese.

=== Different spellings for similar sounds ===
The palatal consonants are spelled differently in the two languages.

Description	Spanish		Portuguese	
Description	Spelling	Pronunciation	Spelling	Pronunciation
palatal "l"	ll	ʎ (~ ʝ)	lh	ʎ
palatal "n"	ñ	ɲ	nh	ɲ (EP), j̃ (BP)
palatal "y"	y	ʝ	i	j

The symbols ⟨ll⟩ and ⟨ñ⟩ are etymological in Spanish, as the sounds they represent are often derived from Latin ll and nn (for those positions, Portuguese has simple ⟨l⟩ and ⟨n⟩; cf. rodilla/rodela, peña/pena). The Portuguese digraphs ⟨lh⟩ and ⟨nh⟩ were adopted from Occitan, as poetry of the troubadours was the most important influence on Portuguese literature up until the 14th century. King Denis of Portugal, who established Portuguese instead of Latin as the official language, was an admirer of the poetry of the troubadours and a poet himself. Examples include names such as Port. Minho (Sp. Miño) and Magalhães (Sp. Magallanes). There are some Portuguese surnames that stylise the phoneme /l/ through a doble letter, archaic or influenced by emigrants, ⟨ll⟩, as in the Vasconcellos (Carolina Michaëlis de Vasconcellos, a linguist) or (de) Mello (Sophia de Mello Breyner Andresen, a writer). The same person can have the same variant (Fernando Collor de Mello, president of Brazil) or different (José Leite de Vasconcelos Cardoso Pereira de Melo, a linguist too).

The letter ⟨y⟩ was used in Portuguese from the 16th to the early 20th century in Greek loans, much as in English (e.g., Psychologia, modern Psicologia 'Psychology'). The orthographic reform in 1911 officially replaced it with ⟨i⟩. The corresponding sound can be regarded as an allophone of the vowel /i/ in both languages. Compare Sp. rey ('king'), mayor ('larger, greater, elder') with Port. rei ('king'), maior ('larger, greater').

The exact pronunciation of these three consonants varies somewhat with dialect. The table indicates only the most common sound values in each language. In most Spanish dialects, the consonants written ⟨ll⟩ and ⟨y⟩ have come to be pronounced the same way, a sound merger known as yeísmo. A similar phenomenon can be found in some dialects of Brazilian Portuguese (e.g., "muié" for mulher, 'woman'), but it is much less widespread than in Spanish.

The Portuguese letter ⟨ç⟩ (c-cedilha), based on a Visigothic form of the letter ⟨z⟩: "ꝣ". In Portuguese it is used before ⟨a⟩, ⟨o⟩, and ⟨u⟩ (including nasals), and never at the beginning or end of any word. It always represents the "soft c" sound, namely [s]. In modern Spanish, it has been replaced by ⟨z⟩. Example: calzado (Sp.), calçado (Port.) 'footwear'.

=== Correspondences between word endings ===
Various word endings are consistently different in the two languages.

- Spanish -n corresponds to Portuguese -m when in word-final position (e.g., Spanish: jardín, algún; Portuguese: jardim, algum). In Portuguese, word- or syllable-final ⟨m⟩ and ⟨n⟩ indicate nasalization of the previous vowel; e.g., som /ˈsõ/ 'sound' (see phonology below). In the plural, ⟨m⟩ is replaced with an ⟨n⟩ (Spanish: jardines, algunos; Portuguese: jardins, alguns), that is because in these cases the ⟨m⟩ is not in word-final position anymore. Notice, some rare learned words in Portuguese and Spanish may also have a word final -n (e.g., Portuguese abdómen/abdômen 'abdomen'), and -m (e.g., Spanish tándem 'tandem'), respectively. (Word-final -n in Portuguese is pronounced [n], while word-final -m in Spanish is also pronounced [n] because there is no word-final [m] sound originally in Spanish.)
- Common exceptions to the above rule concern the Spanish noun endings:
  - -án and -ano, which normally correspond to -ão or -ã in Portuguese (Irán vs Irão (EP)/Irã (BP) 'Iran', hermano vs irmão 'brother', and huérfano vs órfão, 'orphan m.');
  - -ana, which corresponds to -ã (hermana vs irmã 'sister', mañana vs manhã 'morning', huérfana vs órfã 'orphan f.');
  - -ón / -ción or -cción / -sión, which usually correspond to -ão / -ção or -(c)ção / -são or -ssão (melón vs melão 'melon', opción vs opção 'option', corrección vs corre(c)ção 'correction', pensión vs pensão 'pension', or admisión vs admissão 'admission');
  - -on or -an, which corresponds to -ão in most monosyllables (son vs são 'they are', tan vs tão 'as, so');
- The singular noun or adjective endings -án and -ón in Spanish both usually correspond to Portuguese -ão, and likewise the Spanish ending -ano often corresponds to Portuguese -ão (although there are also many Portuguese words ending in -ano, including gentilics such as cubano, boliviano, etc.). The plurals of the Portuguese words in -ão, however, generally preserve the historical distinctions: Portuguese -ãos, -ães, and -ões generally correspond to Spanish -anos, -anes, and -ones, respectively:
  - -ãos, as in mão/mãos (Spanish mano/manos, English 'hand(s)');
  - -ães, as in capitão/capitães (Spanish capitán/capitanes, English 'captain(s)');
  - -ões, as in melão/melões (Spanish melón/melones, English 'melon(s)').
- Notable exceptions to the above rule:
  - verão/verões (Spanish verano(s), English 'summer(s)');
  - vulcão/vulcões (Spanish volcán/volcanes, English 'volcano');
  - ancião, which allows the three plural forms: anciãos, anciães and anciões (Spanish anciano(s), English 'elder(s)').
  - guardião, which allows the three plural forms: guardiãos, guardiães and guardiões (Spanish guardián/guardianes, English 'guardian');
  - vilão, which allows the three plural forms: vilãos, vilães and vilões (Spanish villano/villanos, English 'villain');
  - João/Joões (Spanish Juan/Juanes, English 'John'). This plural can be seen in words such as joão-de-barro/joões-de-barro (Red Ovenbird).
- The 3rd person plural endings of the preterite indicative tense are spelled with -on in Spanish (pensaron, vivieron 'they thought, they lived'), but with -am in Portuguese (pensaram, viveram).
- In Portuguese words ending in -l form their plurals by dropping ⟨l⟩ and adding -is (-eis when final unstressed -il): caracol/caracóis (Spanish caracol(es), English 'snail(s)'), fácil/fáceis (Spanish fácil(es), English 'easy').
- In Spanish, adjectives and nouns ending in -z form their plurals by replacing ⟨z⟩ with ⟨c⟩ (-ces); e.g., feroz/feroces (Portuguese feroz(es), English 'ferocious'), vez/veces (Portuguese vez(es) English 'time(s)').
- Another conspicuous difference is the use of -z in Spanish versus -s in Portuguese at the end of unstressed syllables, especially when the consonant is the last letter in a word. A few examples:

Álvarez, Fernández, Suárez, izquierda, mezquino, lápiz (Spanish)
Álvares, Fernandes, Soares, esquerda, mesquinho, lápis (Portuguese)

- Other correspondences between word endings are:
  - -dad(es) or -tad(es) (Spanish) and -dade(s) (Portuguese), as in bondad(es) vs bondade(s) 'goodness(es)' and libertad(es) vs liberdade(s) 'liberty/ies'. The word ending -zade(s) is also found in Portuguese, e.g., amizade(s) (Spanish amistad(es), English 'friendship(s)');
  - -ud(es) (Spanish) and -ude(s) (Portuguese), as in virtud(es) vs virtude(s) 'virtue';
  - -ble(s) (Spanish) and -vel/eis (Portuguese), as in amable(s) vs amável/amáveis 'amiable';
  - -je(s) (Spanish) and -gem/ns (Portuguese), as in lenguaje(s) vs linguagem/linguagens 'language(s)';
  - -aso (Spanish) and -asso (Portuguese), as in escaso vs escasso 'scarce';
  - -eso (Spanish) and -esso (Portuguese), as in espeso vs espesso 'thick';
  - -esa (Spanish) and -essa or -esa (Portuguese), as in condesa vs condessa 'countess' and inglesa vs inglesa 'Englishwoman';
  - -eza (Spanish) and -iça or -eza (Portuguese), as in pereza vs preguiça 'laziness' and naturaleza vs natureza 'nature';
  - -ez (Spanish) and -ice and -ez (Portuguese), as in idiotez vs idiotice 'idiocy' (there are unpredictable exceptions in Portuguese, e.g., estupidez 'stupidity') and timidez vs timidez 'shyness';
  - -izar (Spanish) and -izar or -isar (Portuguese), as in realizar vs realizar 'to realize/realise' and analizar vs analisar 'to analyze/analyse' (notice there are also some Spanish verbs that in -isar; e.g., avisar 'warn', pesquisar 'research', etc.) Brazilian Portuguese uses an alternative word ending in -issar in some exceptional cases; e.g., aterrissar, alunissar (European Portuguese aterrar, alunar; Spanish aterrizar, alunizar, English 'landing', 'moon landing');
  - -azar (Spanish) and -açar (Portuguese), amenazar vs ameaçar 'threaten';
  - -anza (Spanish) and -ança (Portuguese), esperanza vs esperança 'hope';
  - -encia (Spanish) and -ença or -ência (Portuguese), as in diferencia vs diferença 'difference' and ocurrencia vs ocorrência 'occurrence' (in Spanish there are few exceptional words ending in -enza; e.g., vergüenza 'shame');
  - -icia (Spanish) and -iça or -ícia (Portuguese), as in justicia vs justiça 'justice' and malicia vs malícia 'malice';
  - -izo (Spanish) and -iço (Portuguese), as in movedizo vs movediço 'moveable';
  - -miento or -mento (Spanish) and -mento (Portuguese), as in sentimiento vs sentimento 'feeling, sentiment' and reglamento vs regulamento 'rules, regulations';
  - -ísimo (Spanish) and -íssimo (Portuguese), as in fidelísimo vs fidelíssimo or even fidelissíssimo 'most loyal'.

=== Accentuation and nasalization ===
Both languages use diacritics to mark the stressed syllable of a word whenever it is not otherwise predictable from spelling. Since Spanish does not differentiate between mid-open and mid-close vowels and nasal vowels, it uses only one accent, the acute. Portuguese usually uses the acute accent ( ´ ), but also uses the circumflex accent ( ˆ ) on the mid-close vowels ⟨ê⟩ and ⟨ô⟩ and the stressed (always nasal in Brasil) ⟨â⟩.

Although the Spanish ⟨y⟩ can be either a consonant or a vowel, as a vowel it never takes an accent. At the end of a word, the Portuguese diphthong -ai is the equivalent of the Spanish -ay, however, -ai can have an accent on the ⟨í⟩ to break the diphthong into two separate vowels, e.g., açaí (three syllables). Without the accent, as in Spanish, the last syllable would be a diphthong: Paraguai (Portuguese) and Paraguay (Spanish) 'Paraguay'.

Portuguese nasal vowels occur before ⟨n⟩ and ⟨m⟩ (see phonology below) without an accent mark, as these consonants are not fully pronounced in such cases. The tilde (~), is only used on nasal diphthongs such as ⟨ão⟩ [ɐ̃w̃] and ⟨õe⟩ [õj̃], plus the final ⟨ã⟩ [ɐ̃], which replaces the -am ending, as the latter is reserved for verbs, e.g., amanhã [amɐˈɲɐ̃] 'tomorrow'.

- Initial and middle: vowel + ⟨n⟩ + consonant (except ⟨h⟩, ⟨p⟩ or ⟨b⟩): antecedente, geringonça, mundo, ênfase
- Initial and middle: vowel + ⟨m⟩ + bilabial consonant (⟨p⟩ or ⟨b⟩): caçamba, emprego, supimpa, pomba, penumbra
- Final: vowel + ⟨m⟩: fizeram, em, ruim, bom, algum (except for learned words, e.g., abdómen/abdômen, hífen, etc.)

These do not alter the rules for stress, though note endings -im, -ins and -um, -uns are stressed, as are their non-nasal counterparts (see below). A couple of two-letter words consist of only the nasal vowel: em and um.

Phonetic vowel nasalization occurs in Spanish—vowels may get slightly nasalized in contact with nasal consonants—but it is not phonemically distinctive. In Portuguese, on the other hand, vowel nasalization is distinctive, and therefore phonemic: pois /ˈpojs/ or /ˈpojʃ/ 'because' vs pões /ˈpõj̃s/ or /ˈpõj̃ʃ/ '(you) put'.

Portuguese changes vowel sounds with (and without) accents marks. Unaccented ⟨o⟩ (/u/, /o/, /ɔ/) and ⟨e⟩ (/i/, /ɨ/, /e/, /ɛ/, /ɐ/), acute accented ⟨ó⟩ (/ɔ/) and ⟨é⟩ (/ɛ/), or circumflex accented ⟨ô⟩ (/o/) and ⟨ê⟩ (/e/). Thus, nós [ˈnɔs] or [ˈnɔʃ] 'we' vs nos [nus] or [nuʃ] 'us', avô [aˈvo] 'grandfather' vs avó [aˈvɔ] 'grandmother', se [si] or [sɨ] 'itself, himself, herself' reflexive pronoun vs sé [ˈsɛ] 'seat, headquarters' vs sê [ˈse] 'to be' 2nd person imperative. Spanish pronunciation makes no such distinction.

The grave accent ( ` ) is also used in Portuguese to indicate the contraction of the preposition a (to) with a few words beginning with the vowel a, but not to indicate stress. In other cases, it is the combination of the preposition and the feminine definite article; in other words, the equivalent of a la ('to the') in Spanish. Às is used for the plural (a las in Spanish).

- a (prep.) + a(s) (def. article 'the') = à(s) ('to the').
- a (prep.) + aquele(s), aquela(s) (pron. 'that') = àquele(s), àquela(s)—underlined stressed syllable—('to that').
- a (prep.) + aquilo (pron. n. 'that') = àquilo ('to that').

The diaeresis or trema ( ¨ ) is used in Spanish to indicate ⟨u⟩ is pronounced in the sequence ⟨gu⟩; e.g., desagüe [deˈsaɣwe]. As the Portuguese grave accent, the trema does not indicate stress. In Brazilian Portuguese it was also used for the digraphs ⟨gu⟩ and ⟨qu⟩ for the same purpose as Spanish (e.g., former BP spelling *qüinqüênio [kwĩˈkwẽɲu], EP quinquénio [kwĩˈkwɛnju] 'five-year period'), however since the implementation of the Portuguese Language Orthographic Agreement in Brazil, the trema was abolished (current BP spelling quinquênio [kwĩˈkwẽɲu]), and its usage was restricted to some loanwords (e.g., mülleriano 'Müllerian').

The accentuation rules (including those of predictable stress) of Portuguese and Spanish are similar, but not identical. Discrepancies are especially pervasive in words that contain i or u in their last syllable. Note the Portuguese diphthongs ei and ou are the approximate Spanish equivalent of e and o respectively, but any word ending with these diphthongs is, by default, stressed on its final syllable.

Compare the following pairs of cognates, where the stress falls on the same syllable in both languages:

taxi,	viví,	bambú,	ansia,	seria,	sería,	jardín,	pensáis,	pensó	(Spanish)
táxi,	vivi,	bambu,	ânsia,	séria,	seria,	jardim,	pensais,	pensou	(Portuguese)

Semivowel–vowel sequences are treated differently in both languages when it comes to accentuation rules. A sequence of a semivowel adjacent to a vowel is by default assumed to be read as a diphthong (part of the same syllable) in Spanish, whereas it is by default assumed to be read as a hiatus (belonging to different syllables) in Portuguese. For both languages, accentuation rules consistently indicate something other than the default.

A consequence of this is that words that are pronounced alike in both languages are written according to different accentuation rules. Some examples:

- emergencia (Spanish), emergência (Portuguese) 'emergency'
- tolerancia (Spanish), tolerância (Portuguese) 'tolerance'
- audacia (Spanish), audácia (Portuguese) 'audace'
- ocio (Spanish), ócio (Portuguese) 'leisure'
- continuo (Spanish), contínuo (Portuguese) 'continuous'
- continúo (Spanish), continuo (Portuguese) 'I continue'

Another consequence (though less common) is that some words are written exactly (or almost exactly) the same in both languages, but the stress falls on different syllables:

- democracia (Spanish, rising diphthong at the end), democracia (Portuguese, the stress on -ci- breaks the diphthong) 'democracy'
- policía (Spanish, the stress on -cí- breaks the diphthong), polícia (Portuguese) 'police'

== Phonology ==
Although the vocabularies of Spanish and Portuguese are remarkably similar, not surprisingly, the two languages differ phonologically from each other, very likely because of the stronger Celtic substratum in Portuguese, and less so in Spanish. Phonetically Portuguese bears similarities to French, Catalan and Italian, while the phonetics of Spanish are more comparable to those of Greek (in Castilian Spanish), Sardinian, Sicilian, and Italian. Plus, Portuguese has a significantly larger phonemic inventory than Spanish. This may partially explain why Portuguese is generally a little more challenging to Spanish speakers despite the strong lexical similarity, grammar and sentence structure between the two languages.

One of the main differences between the Spanish and Portuguese pronunciation are the vowel sounds. Standard Spanish has a basic vowel phonological system, with five phonemic vowels (/a/, /e̞/, /i/, /o̞/, /u/). Phonetic nasalization occurs in Spanish for vowels occurring between nasal consonants or when preceding a syllable-final nasal consonant (/n/ and /m/), but it is not distinctive as in Portuguese. Dialectally, there are Spanish dialects with a greater number of vowels, with some (as Murcian and Eastern Andalusian) reaching up to 8 to 10 vowel sounds. On the other hand, Portuguese has seven to nine oral vowels (/a/, /ɐ/*, /e/, /ɛ/, /ɨ/*, /i/, /o/, /ɔ/, /u/) (/ɐ/ is closer to [ə] in Portugal, while the near-close near-back unrounded vowel /ɨ/—also rendered as [ɯ̟] or [ʊ̜]—is only found in European Portuguese) plus five phonemic nasal vowels (/ɐ̃/, /ẽ/, /ĩ/, /õ/, /ũ/) when preceding an omitted syllable-final nasal (⟨n⟩ and ⟨m⟩) or when is marked with a tilde (~): ⟨ã⟩ and ⟨õ⟩. This appears to be, similarly to French, a Celtic phonological adaptation to Latin. Portuguese, as Catalan, uses vowel height, contrasting stressed and unstressed (reduced) vowels. Moreover, Spanish has two semivowels as allophones, [j, w]; while Portuguese has four, two oral [i̯ ~ ɪ̯], [u̯ ~ ʊ̯] and two nasalized glides [j̃ ~ ɪ̯̃], [w̃ ~ ʊ̯̃] (non-syllabic near-close vowels, as those of most English speech, are allophones of the glides in the Brazilian dialects where near-closeds are used).

The following considerations are based on a comparison of standard versions of Spanish and Portuguese. Apparent divergence of the information below from anyone's personal pronunciation may indicate one's idiolect (or dialect) diverges from the mentioned standards. Information on Portuguese phonology is adapted from Celso Pedro Luft (Novo Manual de Português, 1971), and information on Spanish phonology adapted from Manuel Seco (Gramática Esencial del Español, 1994).

Comparing the phonemic inventory of the two languages, a noticeable divergence stands out. First, standard Portuguese has more phonemes than Spanish. Also, each language has phonemes that are not shared by the other.

=== Early phonetic divergence ===
==== Vowels ====
Spanish and Portuguese have been diverging for over a thousand years. One of the most noticeable early differences between them concerned the result of the stressed vowels of Latin:

Classical Latin (spelling)	Vulgar Latin (pronunciation)	Spanish		Portuguese	
Classical Latin (spelling)	Vulgar Latin (pronunciation)	Spelling	Pronunciation	Spelling	Pronunciation
a	/a/	a ~ á	/a/	a ~ á ~ â	/a/ ~ /ɐ/^{1}
ā	/a/	a ~ á	/a/	a ~ á ~ â	/a/ ~ /ɐ/^{1}
e, ae	/ɛ/	ie ~ ié	/je̞/	e ~ é	/ɛ/
ē, oe	/e/	e ~ é	/e̞/	e ~ ê	/e/
i	/e/	e ~ é	/e̞/	e ~ ê	/e/
ī	/i/	i ~ í	/i/	i ~ í	/i/
o	/ɔ/	ue ~ ué	/we̞/	o ~ ó	/ɔ/
ō	/o/	o ~ ó	/o̞/	o ~ ô	/o/
u	/o/	o ~ ó	/o̞/	o ~ ô	/o/
ū	/u/	u ~ ú	/u/	u ~ ú	/u/
au	/aw/	o ~ ó	/o̞/	ou	/ow/^{2}

^{1}The vowels /a/ and /ɐ/ occur largely in complementary distribution.
^{2}This diphthong has been reduced to the monophthong /o/ in many dialects of modern Portuguese.

As vowel length ceased to be distinctive in the transition from Latin to Romance, the stressed vowels e and o became ie and ue in Spanish whenever they were short (Latin petra → Spanish piedra 'stone'; Latin moritvr → Spanish muere "he dies"). Similar diphthongizations can be found in other Romance languages (French pierre, Italian pietra, Romanian piatră; French meurt, Italian muore, Romanian moare), but in Galician-Portuguese these vowels underwent a qualitative change instead (Portuguese/Galician pedra, morre), becoming lower, as also happened with short i and short u in stressed syllables. The Classical Latin vowels /e/-/eː/ and /o/-/oː/ were correspondingly lowered in Spanish and turned into diphthongs /je̞/ and /we̞/. In Spanish, short e and o and long ē and ō merged into mid vowels, /e̞/ and /o̞/, while in Portuguese these vowels stayed as close-mid, /e/ and /o/ and open-mid, /ɛ/ and /ɔ/, as in Vulgar Latin.

Portuguese has five phonemic nasal vowels (/ɐ̃/, /ẽ/, /ĩ/, /õ/, /ũ/), which, according to historical linguistics, arose from the assimilation of the nasal consonants /m/ and /n/, often at the end of syllables. Syllable-final m and n are still written down to indicate nasalization, even though they are no longer fully pronounced, that is, either [ⁿ] (before obstruents) or elided completely. In other cases, nasal vowels are marked with a tilde (ã, õ). Not all words containing vowel + n have the nasal sound, as the subsequent letter must be a consonant for this to occur: e.g., anel /ɐˈnɛw/ ('ring') –oral/non-nasal– vs anca /ˈɐ̃kɐ/ ('hip') –nasal–.

However, in some Brazilian dialects, most vowels (including the allophones present only in unstressed environment) have nasal allophones before one of the nasal consonants /m/, /n/, /ɲ/, followed by another vowel. In other Brazilian dialects, only stressed vowels can be nasalized this way. In European Portuguese, nasalization is absent in this environment.

The Portuguese digraph ou (pronounced usually as the diphthong [ow], but sometimes as a monophthong [o]) corresponds to the final -ó of Spanish -ar verbs in the preterite tense; e.g., Spanish descansó and Portuguese descansou ("he/she rested"). The Spanish irregular verb forms in -oy (e.g., doy "I give", estoy "I am", soy "I am", voy "I go") correspond to Portuguese forms in -ou (e.g., dou, estou, sou, vou). But in some other words, conversely, Spanish o corresponds to Portuguese oi, e.g., Spanish cosa, Portuguese coisa "thing"; Spanish oro "gold", Portuguese usually ouro, but sometimes oiro.

Stressed vowel alternations may occur in Portuguese, but not in Spanish:

Spanish	Portuguese	English
nuevo [ˈnwe̞βo̞]	novo [ˈnovu]	new (m. sg.)
nueva [ˈnwe̞βa]	nova [ˈnɔvɐ]	new (f. sg.)
nuevos [ˈnwe̞βo̞s]	novos [ˈnɔvuʃ]	new (m. pl.)
nuevas [ˈnwe̞βas]	novas [ˈnɔvɐʃ]	new (f. pl.)

A 1949 study by the Italian-American linguist Mario Pei, analyzing the degree to which seven Romance languages diverged from Classical with respect to their accent vocalization, yielded the following measurements of divergence (with higher percentages indicating greater divergence from the stressed vowels of Classical Latin): Logudorese Sardinian 8%, Italian 12%, Spanish 20%, Romanian 23.5%, Occitan 25%, Portuguese 31%, and French 44%. Of relevance here, Pei's results mark the Spanish language's stressed vowels as more conservative than those of Portuguese.

Pei's study emphasized, however, that it represented only "a very elementary, incomplete and tentative demonstration" of how statistical methods could measure linguistic change, assigned "frankly arbitrary" point values to various types of change, and did not compare languages in the sample with respect to any characteristics or forms of divergence other than stressed vowels, among other caveats.

===== Unstressed vowels =====
The history of the unstressed vowels in Spanish and Portuguese is not as well known as that of the stressed vowels, but some points are generally agreed upon. Spanish has the five short vowels of classical Latin, /a/, /e̞/, /i/, /o̞/, /u/. It has also two semivowels, [j] and [w], that appear in diphthongs, but these can be considered allophones of /i/ and /u/, respectively. The pronunciation of the unstressed vowels does not differ much from that of stressed vowels. Unstressed, non-syllabic /e̞/ /o̞/, and /a/ can be reduced to [ʝ], [w̝] and complete elision in some dialects; e.g., poetisa [pw̝e̞ˈtisa] ('poet' f.), línea [ˈlinʝa] ('line'), ahorita [o̞ˈɾita] ('now').

The system of seven oral vowels of Vulgar Latin has been fairly well preserved in Portuguese, as in the closely related Galician language. In Portuguese, unstressed vowels have been more unstable, both diachronically (across time) and synchronically (between dialects), producing new vowel sounds. The vowels written ⟨a⟩, ⟨e⟩ and ⟨o⟩ are pronounced in different ways according to several factors, most notably whether they are stressed, and whether they occur in the last syllable of a word. The basic paradigm is shown in the following table (it has some exceptions).

Spanish	Brazilian Portuguese				European Portuguese			
Spanish	Stressed	Syllable before stress, with coda	Unstressed and non-terminal	Unstressed and terminal	Stressed	Unstressed, onset of diphthong	Unstressed and non-terminal	Unstressed and terminal
/a/	/a/ or /ɐ ~ ə/ ^{1}	/a/ or /a ~ ɐ/	/a/	/a ~ ɐ ~ ə/	/a/ or /ɐ/	/a ~ ɐ/ or /ə/	/ə/ or /a/	/ə/
/e̞/	/e/ or /ɛ/	/e ~ e̞/ or /ɛ ~ e̞/ ^{2}	/e ~ e̞ ~ ɛ/ or /ɪ ~ i/	/ɪ ~ i/	/e/ or /ɛ/	/e/ (/ej ~ ɐj/ ^{3})	/ɨ/ or /ɛ/	/ɨ/
/o̞/	/o/ or /ɔ/	/o ~ o̞/ or /ɔ ~ o̞/ ^{2}	/o ~ o̞ ~ ɔ/ or /ʊ ~ u/	/ʊ ~ u/	/o/ or /ɔ/	/o/ (/ow ~ ɐw/ ^{3})	/u/ or /ɔ/	/u/

^{1} Always nasalized in this environment in most dialects, that is, [ɐ̃ ~ ə̃]

^{2} Mostly in Northeastern Brazil. In some other dialects (including those of northern Brazil, Rio de Janeiro, Espírito Santo, Minas Gerais and the Brazilian Federal District), this also occurs if the stressed vowel is open rather than closed (/ɛ/ or /ɔ/, rather than /e/ or /o/) due to vowel harmony.

^{3} Only in some dialects, the first mainly in the area including and surrounding Lisbon (not present in much of northern and insular Portugal, as in Brazil), and the latter mainly in some hinterland northern Portuguese accents (not present in southern and insular Portugal, as in Brazil)

Brazilian unstressed vowel allophones vary according to the geographical region of the country. Near-close [ʊ], [ɪ] and unstressed close-mid [e], [o] are found in southern and western accents, where postvocalic /r/ has a "soft" allophone (a flap, a coronal approximant, or a rhotic vowel), and postvocalic sibilants (written ⟨s⟩, ⟨x⟩, and ⟨z⟩) in native words are always alveolar [s, z]. Meanwhile, these close allophones do not occur in the northern and eastern accents, where postvocalic /r/ has a "hard" allophone (velar, uvular, or glottal) and postvocalic sibilants may be, consistently or not, post-alveolar [ʃ, ʒ, ɕ, ʑ]. In the accents where postvocalic sibilants are always post-alveolar, such as those of Florianópolis and Rio de Janeiro, or in the accents influenced by them, any unstressed /a ~ ɐ/, [e̞ ~ ɛ] and [o̞ ~ ɔ] may be raised (like in Portugal), to [ɐ], [i] and [u], respectively. While this is true of all colloquial BP, it is especially characteristic of the latter dialects). This increased vowel reduction is also present in accents of the Brazilian Northeast, particularly from Alagoas to Piauí.

Similar alternation patterns to these exist in other Romance languages such as Catalan and Occitan. Although it is mostly an allophonic variation, some dialects have developed minimal pairs that distinguish the stressed variants from the unstressed ones. The vowel /ɨ/ is often elided in connected speech (it is not present in Brazilian Portuguese).

Some Brazilian dialects diphthongize stressed vowels to [ai̯], [ɛi̯], [ei̯], etc. (except /i/), before a sibilant at the end of a syllable (written ⟨s⟩, ⟨x⟩, ⟨z⟩, or rarely, ⟨sh⟩). For instance, Jesus [ʒe̞ˈzui̯s] 'Jesus', faz [ˈfai̯s] 'he does', dez [ˈdɛi̯s] 'ten'. This has led to the use of meia (meaning meia dúzia, 'half a dozen') for seis [sei̯s] 'six' when making enumerations, to avoid any confusion with três [tɾei̯s] 'three' on the telephone. In Lisbon and surrounding areas, stressed /e/ is pronounced [ɐ] or [ɐj] when it comes before an alveolo-palatal /ʎ/, /ɲ/, [ɕ], [ʑ] or palato-alveolar /ʃ/, /ʒ/ consonants followed by another vowel.

The orthography of Portuguese, which is partly etymological and analogical, does not indicate these sound changes. This makes the written language look deceptively similar to Spanish. For example, although breve ('brief') is spelled the same in both languages, it is pronounced [ˈbɾe̞βe̞] in Spanish, but [ˈbɾɛvi ~ ˈbɾɛv(ɨ)] in Portuguese. In Brazilian Portuguese, in the vast majority of cases, the only difference between final -e and -i is the stress, as both are pronounced as /i/. The former is unstressed, and the latter is stressed without any diacritical mark. In European Portuguese, final -e is not pronounced or is pronounced as [ɨ], unlike i, which is consistently [i].

==== Consonants ====
Some of the most characteristic sound changes undergone by the consonants from Latin to Spanish and Portuguese are shown in the table below.

Latin	Spanish	Portuguese	Examples	Meaning
cl-, fl-, pl-	ll- or pl	ch-	clāmāre → S. llamar, P. chamar plumbum → S. plomo, P. chumbo flammam → S. llama, P. chama plēnum → S. lleno, P. cheio (also pleno)	'to call' 'lead' (metal) 'flame' 'full'
-lt-, -ct-	-ch-	-it-	multum → S. mucho, P. muito noctem → S. noche, P. noite pectum → S. pecho, P. peito	'much' 'night' 'chest'
f-	h- (later silent) or f-	f-	fābulāre → S. hablar, P. falar fīlium → S. hijo, P. filho focum → S. fuego, P. fogo	'to speak' 'son' 'fire'
ja-	ya-	ja-	iam → S. ya, P. já iacēre → S. yacer, P. jazer	'already' 'to lie, as in a grave'
-l-	-l-	(elided)	caelum → S. cielo, P. céu (arch. ceo) volāre → S. volar, P. voar	'sky' 'to fly'
-c(u)l-, -li-	-j-	-lh-	oculum → S. ojo, P. olho fīlium → S. hijo, P. filho	'eye' 'son'
-ll-	-ll-	-l-	castellum → S. castillo, P. castelo	'castle'
-n-	-n-	(elided)	generālem → S. general, P. geral tenēre → S. tener, P. ter	'general' (adj.) 'to have'
-ni-	-ñ-	-nh-	vīnea → S. viña, P. vinha	'vine'
-nn-	-ñ-	-n-	annum → S. año, P. ano cannam → S. caña, P. cana	'year' 'reed'

*reconstructed

Peculiar to early Spanish (as in the Gascon dialect of Occitan, possibly due to a Basque substratum) was the loss of Latin initial f- whenever it was followed by a vowel that did not diphthongize. Thus, Spanish hijo and hablar correspond to Portuguese filho and falar (from Latin fīlium and fābulāre, 'son' and 'to speak' respectively). Nevertheless, in a few cases Spanish has retained the Latin f-, so that Portuguese fogo corresponds to Spanish fuego (from Latin focum 'fire'); while in other cases the Latin word has yielded two different terms in Spanish, one beginning with f- and the other with h-, with slightly different nuances or altogether different meanings: Latin fastidium > Spanish hastío - fastidio (learned borrowing from Latin), Portuguese fastio 'boredom'; Latin fibra > Spanish fibra 'fiber' (learned borrowing from Latin) - hebra 'thread', Portuguese fibra (both meanings); Latin fascis > Spanish haz 'beam' - fajo 'bundle' (borrowing from Aragonese), Portuguese feixe (both meanings).

Another typical difference concerned the result of Latin -l- and -n- in intervocalic position:

- When single, they were retained in Spanish but elided in Portuguese. Often, the loss of the consonant was followed by the merger of the two surrounding vowels (as in the examples in the table above), or by the insertion of an epenthetic vowel between them (Latin harēnam → Spanish arena, Portuguese arẽa, today areia 'sand').
- When double, they developed into the Spanish palatals ⟨ll⟩ /ʎ/ (merged with /ʝ/ in most contemporary Spanish dialects) and ⟨ñ⟩ /ɲ/. Indeed, the Spanish letter ⟨ñ⟩ was originally a shorthand for nn. In Portuguese, -ll- and -nn- just became single, ⟨l⟩ /l/ and ⟨n⟩ /n/, respectively.
- When followed by the semivowel i, l coalesced with it into a ⟨j⟩ /x/ in Spanish. In Portuguese, l and n followed by semivowel i were palatalized into ⟨lh⟩ /ʎ/ and ⟨nh⟩ /ɲ/, respectively.

Other consonant clusters of Latin also took markedly different routes in the two languages in their archaic period:

Origin	Spanish	Portuguese	Meaning
argillam	arcilla	argila	'clay'
blandum	blando	brando	'soft'
cāseum	queso	queijo	'cheese'
oculum → oc'lu	ojo	olho	'eye'
hominem → hom'ne	hombre	homem	'man'
tremulāre → trem'lare	temblar	tremer	'to tremble'

Learned words such as pleno, ocular, no(c)turno, tremular, and so on, were not included in the examples above, since they were adapted directly from Classical Latin in later times.

The tables above represent only general trends with many exceptions, due to:

1. Other phonological processes at work in old Spanish and old Portuguese, which interfered with these.
2. Later regularization by analogy with related words.
3. Later borrowing of learned words directly from Latin, especially since the Renaissance, which did not respect the original sound laws.
4. Mutual borrowing, from Spanish to Portuguese or vice versa.

==== Synaeresis ====
Portuguese has tended to eliminate hiatuses that were preserved in Spanish, merging similar consecutive vowels into one (often after the above-mentioned loss of intervocalic -l- and -n-). This results in many Portuguese words being one syllable shorter than their Spanish cognates:

creído, leer, mala, manzana, mañana, poner, reír, venir (Spanish)
crido, ler, má, maçã, manhã, pôr, rir, vir (Portuguese)

In other cases, Portuguese reduces consecutive vowels to a diphthong, again resulting in one syllable fewer:

a-te-o, eu-ro-pe-o, pa-lo, ve-lo (Spanish)
a-teu, eu-ro-peu, pau, véu (Portuguese)

There are nevertheless a few words where the opposite happened, such as Spanish comprender versus Portuguese compreender, from Latin comprehendere.

=== Different sounds with the same spelling ===
Since the late Middle Ages, both languages have gone through sound shifts and mergers that set them further apart.

==== Sibilants ====
The most marked phonetic divergence between Spanish and Portuguese in their modern period concerned the evolution of the sibilants. In the Middle Ages, both had a rich system of seven sibilants – paired according to affrication and voicing: /s/, /ts/, /z/, /dz/, /ʃ/, /tʃ/, and /dʒ/ (the latter probably in free variation with /ʒ/, as still happens today in Ladino) – and spelled virtually the same in Spanish and Portuguese.

Medieval Spanish and Portuguese	Modern Portuguese^{1,2}			Modern Spanish^{1}		
Pronunciation	Spelling	Pronunciation	Examples	Spelling	Pronunciation	Examples
/s/	s-, -ss-	/s/	saber 'to know', passar 'to pass'	s	/s/	saber, pasar
/z/	-s-	/z/	casa 'house'	s	/s/	casa
/ts/	ç/c	/s/	açor 'hawk', cego 'blind'	z/c	/θ/ or /s/	azor, ciego
/dz/	z	/z/	fazer 'to do'	z/c	/θ/ or /s/	hacer
/ʃ/	x	/ʃ/	oxalá 'I hope; God grant'	j	/x/	ojalá
/dʒ ~ ʒ/	j/g	/ʒ/	jogar 'to play', gente 'people'	j/g	/x/	jugar, gente
/tʃ/	ch	/ʃ/	chuva 'rain'	ch	/tʃ/	chubasco 'cloudburst' (from Port. chuvasco)

^{1}Before vowels; in the coda position, there are dialectal variations within each language, not discussed here.
^{2}Modern Portuguese has for the most part kept the medieval spelling.

After the Renaissance, the two languages reduced their inventory of sibilants, but in different ways:

- Devoicing in Spanish: the voiced sibilants written ⟨-s-⟩, ⟨z⟩ and ⟨j/g⟩ became voiceless, merging with ⟨s-/-ss-⟩, ⟨c/ç⟩ and ⟨x⟩, respectively; voiced sibilant [z] only remains an allophone of /s/ before voiced consonants. In many modern Spanish dialects, ⟨c/z⟩ (/θ/) is also indistinguishable from ⟨s⟩ (/s/) (see seseo). Later, the palato-alveolar fricative ⟨x⟩ /ʃ/ changed into the velar fricative /x/, while ⟨ch⟩ stayed unchanged (/tʃ/). Spanish spelling has been updated according to these sound changes.
- Deaffrication in Portuguese: the affricates written ⟨c/ç⟩, ⟨z⟩ and ⟨ch⟩ became plain fricatives, merging with the sibilants ⟨s-/-ss-⟩, ⟨-s-⟩ and ⟨x⟩ in most dialects, respectively. In spite of this, modern Portuguese has for the most part kept the medieval spelling.
- Deaffrication in Portuguese: some rural hinterland northern Portuguese dialects as well the Mirandese language preserved the medieval distinction, still indicated by the spelling, with the former affricates being voiceless laminal, voiced laminal and still voiceless post-alveolar affricate /tʃ/, respectively, and the sibilants being voiceless apical, voiced apical and voiceless palato-alveolar. As much of Brazilian Portuguese, these dialects have alveolar coda sibilants, though a voiceless apico-alveolar fricative has a hushing-like sound, more similar to /ʃ/.

==== Other pronunciation differences ====
Spelling	Pronunciation		Notes
Spelling	Spanish	Portuguese	Notes
b	[b ~ β]	[b ~ β] (EP) [b] (BP)	In Spanish and European Portuguese /b/ is lenited after a continuant.
d	[d ~ ð]	[d ~ ð] (EP) [d ~ dʒ] (BP)	In Spanish and European Portuguese /d/ is lenited after a continuant. In all Portuguese dialects, the consonants /t/ and /d/ have affricate allophones, happening when before a palatalizing /i/ ([dʒi ~ dʑi], [tʃi ~ tɕi], mainly in Brazil), or an elided /ɨ/ ~ /e̞/ ~ /ɪ/ or unstressed /i/ before another (that actually becomes /ɨ/ in Portugal), stressed one, leading to sandhi ([dVz] → [dz], [dVs] → [ts], [tVs] → [ts], both in Brazil and Portugal).
t	[t]	[t] (EP) [t ~ tʃ] (BP)	In Spanish and European Portuguese /d/ is lenited after a continuant. In all Portuguese dialects, the consonants /t/ and /d/ have affricate allophones, happening when before a palatalizing /i/ ([dʒi ~ dʑi], [tʃi ~ tɕi], mainly in Brazil), or an elided /ɨ/ ~ /e̞/ ~ /ɪ/ or unstressed /i/ before another (that actually becomes /ɨ/ in Portugal), stressed one, leading to sandhi ([dVz] → [dz], [dVs] → [ts], [tVs] → [ts], both in Brazil and Portugal).
g	[ɡ ~ ɣ]	[ɡ ~ ɣ] (EP) [ɡ] (BP)	In Spanish and European Portuguese /ɡ/ is lenited after a continuant.
-l	[l]	[ɫ] (EP) [w] (BP)	In European Portuguese syllable-final /l/ is velarized [ɫ] as in Catalan (see dark l), while in most Brazilian dialects and some rural European ones it is vocalized to [w]. Caipira rhoticizes to English-like ar, while portunhol da pampa velarizes it.
r-, -rr-	[r]	[ʁ]	In Portuguese, r- and -rr- have several possible pronunciations. In most dialects, it is a guttural r as in French ([ʀ], [ʁ] and [χ] in Portugal and Brazil, [x], [ɣ], [ħ], [h] and [ɦ] in Brazil), while in rural northern Portugal, southern Brazil and African and Asian dialects it is a trilled r [r] (like in Galician). In dialects of Portugal and Galicia and all Brazilian dialects, word final -r may be a tap, though English-like [ɹ], [ɻ] or [ɚ] is more common in some southern and western Brazilian dialects, while in northern and eastern dialects it is guttural. In all Portuguese dialects across the world, word-final -r is always pronounced tap before vowel-initial words. In Spanish, r- and -rr- have kept their original pronunciation as an alveolar trill [r]. Intervocalic -r- is an alveolar tap in both languages [ɾ]. Middle -r- after /l/, /n/, & /s/, and root-initial positions is also trill [r] in Spanish & guttural trill or other variants in Portuguese; the same goes for compound word ciudadrealeño (from Ciudad Real) However, after vowels, the initial r of the root becomes -rr- in prefixed or compound words to reflect the trill pronunciation: prorrogar, infrarrojo, autorretrato, arriesgar, puertorriqueño, Monterrey. Syllable-final -r is either trill [r] or tap [ɾ] in Spanish, but tap is more frequent in colloquial speech and trill is usually pronounced in emphatic and oratorical or formal speech. Word-final -r in Spanish is either tap or trill before a pause or consonant-initial word & only tap before vowel-initial word.
v	[b ~ β]	[v]	Originally, the letters ⟨b⟩ and ⟨v⟩ stood for distinct sounds pronounced [b] and [β], respectively, but the two eventually merged into a single phoneme in Spanish. In most varieties of Portuguese they remained separate phonemes, and the bilabial fricative [β] of Old Portuguese subsequently changed into the labiodental fricative [v], as in French and Italian.

Since no distinction is made anymore between the pronunciation of ⟨b⟩ and ⟨v⟩, Spanish spelling has been reformed according to Classical Latin. In Portuguese, the spelling of these letters is based on pronunciation, which occurred after the Vulgar Latin merger of ⟨b⟩ and ⟨v⟩ in intervocalic position and is similar to modern Italian. This leads to some orthographic disparities:

- Compare for example Spanish gobierno, haber, libro with Portuguese governo, haver, livro.
- The endings of the imperfect indicative tense of 1st. conjugation verbs (with infinitives ending in -ar) are spelled with ⟨b⟩ in Spanish (cantaba, cantabas, cantábamos, and so on), but with ⟨v⟩ in Portuguese (cantava, cantavas, cantávamos, etc.)
- The Spanish adjectival suffix -ble, as in posible (also used in English, "possible"), corresponds to -vel in Portuguese: possível.

In Spanish, the plosives b, d, g are lenited, usually realized as "soft" approximants [β̞, ð̞, ɣ̞] (here represented without the undertracks) after continuants. While similar pronunciations can be heard in European Portuguese, most speakers of Brazilian Portuguese pronounce these phonemes consistently as "hard" plosives [b, d, ɡ]. This can make a Portuguese phrase such as uma bala ("a bullet") sound like una pala ("a shovel") to a Spanish-speaker.

=== Word-final consonants ===
In Spanish, the following word-final consonants are possible: -l, -r, -n, -d, -z, -j, -s, -x, but other final consonants are also allowed in loanwords.

In Portuguese, the following word-final consonants are possible: l, -r, -s, -x; -z (only after a stressed vowel); -n (only after an unstressed vowel). The final -m is an orthographic sign of a nasal sound. Other consonants typically receive a paragogic -e in loanwords.

== Contact forms ==
- Barranquenho a transitional Spanish–Portuguese dialect with Southern Spanish traits spoken in the Portuguese municipality of Barrancos.
- Portuñol/Portunhol is the name for the mixed languages spoken in the borders of Brazil with Spanish-speaking countries.
- Papiamento is a creole language with Spanish and Portuguese influences.
- Judaeo-Spanish language is derived from medieval Castilian language, but has been influenced by Judaeo-Portuguese.
- Fala d'Ambo is a creole language derived from Portuguese but influenced by the rulers of Spanish Guinea.

== See also ==
- Portuguese language
  - History of Portuguese
  - Portuguese dialects
  - Portuguese grammar
    - Portuguese personal pronouns
    - Portuguese verb conjugation
  - Portuguese orthography
  - Portuguese phonology
  - List of Portuguese contracted prepositions
- Spanish language
  - History of the Spanish language
  - Spanish dialects and varieties
  - Spanish grammar
    - Spanish determiners
    - Spanish verbs
  - Spanish orthography
  - Spanish phonology
- Preterite
- Romance languages
  - Romance copula
- Subjunctive mood
- Vulgar Latin
- West Iberian languages
- Comparison of Italian and Spanish
- Portuñol, a hybrid of both languages
- Galician language, a language that shares its history with Portuguese (Galician-Portuguese) but was later subject to Spanish influence. (evolutionaryly akin to Portuguese, phonetically and syntactically in between, lexically both and also with its own particularities)
  - Castrapo, a pejorative for Galician-influenced Spanish.
- Fala, a language part of the Galician-Portuguese family spoken in the Spanish autonomous community of Extremadura.
