= Manuel Seco =

Spanish linguist (1928–2021)

- Born: Manuel Seco Reymundo; 20 September 1928; Madrid, Spain
- Died: 16 December 2021 (aged 93); Madrid, Spain

Seat A of the Real Academia Española
- In office 23 November 1980 (Note: Elected on 5 April 1979) – 16 December 2021
- Preceded by: Vicente García de Diego
- Succeeded by: Pedro Manuel Cátedra

Manuel Seco Reymundo (20 September 1928 – 16 December 2021) was a Spanish lexicographer, linguist and philologist. He worked at the department of lexicography of the Real Academia Española between 1962 and 1993. He became a member of the Academia in 1980.

== Career ==
Seco was born on 20 September 1928 in Madrid, Spain. His father was Rafael Seco y Sánchez (1895–1933) and his mother Carmen Reymundo Mariño. He obtained a degree in philology of the Romance languages at the Central University of Madrid in 1952. He was awarded a further doctorate with the same specialization in 1969, also from the Central University.

In 1960 he started as a professor of Spanish language and literature at various educational facilities. Two years later he took up a position at the lexicography department of the Real Academia Española, to which he was invited by Rafael Lapesa. Seco worked at the department for 31 years. Between 2000 and 2012 he was advisor to the Instituto de Lexicografía. In 2011 Seco was critical of some of the orthography changes the Academia introduced.

Seco is best known for his two lexicographic works on the Spanish language: el Diccionario de dudas y dificultades de la lengua española, a dictionary on doubts and difficulties of the Spanish language, and the Diccionario del español actual, a dictionary of present-day Spanish which he co-authored with Gabino Ramos and Olimpia Andrés.

== Awards and honors ==
Seco was elected to Seat A of the Real Academia Española on 5 April 1979, he took up his seat on 23 November 1980. He was the longest-serving member of the Academia.

In 1999 he was awarded the Grand Cross of the Civil Order of Alfonso X, the Wise.

In 2015 Seco won the Menéndez Pelayo International Prize.
