= Colono people =

Brazilian ethnic group

Povo Colono
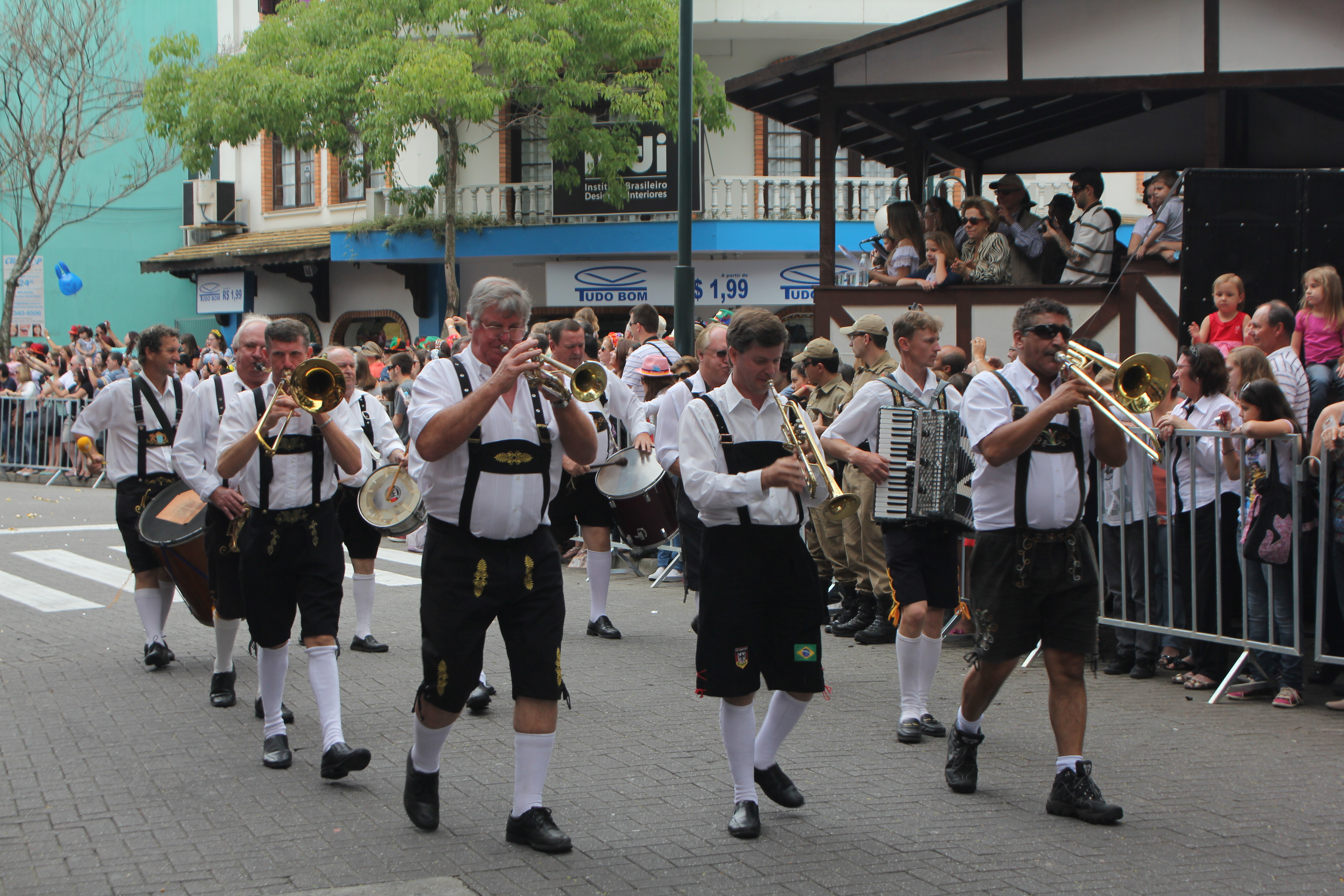
- Colonos in an Oktoberfest festival in Blumenau, Santa Catarina.

Total population
- c. 13-14 million (2022)

Regions with significant populations
- Brazil

Languages
- Portuguese language, Sulista and Gaúcho dialects

Religion
- Predominantly Roman Catholic

Related ethnic groups
- Gaúchos, Catarinenses, Caipiras, Paulistanos, Portuguese, Spaniards, Italians, Germans, Pomeranians, Guaranis

The Colonos (Natively: [koˈlõnus]) , also known as Sulistas (Natively: [suˈlistɐs]) are a Brazilian ethnocultural group distributed across the north of Rio Grande do Sul, inland Santa Catarina and most of Paraná. The Colonos originated from the mixture between local Caipiras and Gaúchos that lived sporadically in the Southern Brazilian highland during colonial times and several European ethnic groups that arrived in the region during the 19th and early 20th century. Most of them are speakers of the Sulista dialect of Brazilian Portuguese, with some in Rio Grande do Sul being speakers of the Gaúcho dialect.

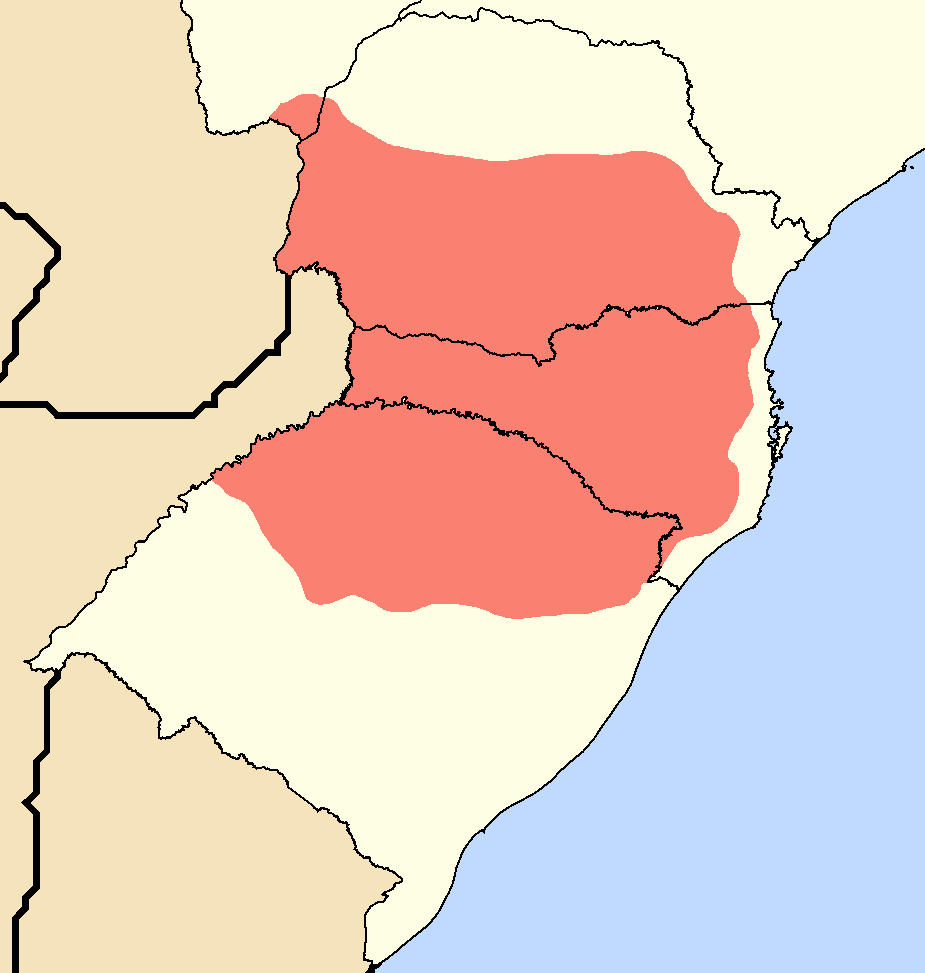
Area inhabited by the Colono people (red) over a map of southern Brazil.

== History ==
=== Pre-19th century ===
The Southern Brazilian highland was initially settled in the 17th and 18th century by Gaúcho and Caipira settlers who expanded into the region via the work of Bandeirantes coming from the south of São Paulo and horseman explorers from the Jacúi river valley; these colonists were mostly descended from Portuguese and native Tupi-Guarani speaking Amerindians, with lower amounts of ancestry from Africans and Spaniards.

The colder climate, dense vegetation and hilly terrain made it difficult for settlers to establish themselves in the area, as the amount of arable land wasn't enough to sustain a family's food needs with the agricultural technology of the time, and the occurrence of frosts and occasional snow in the winter posed a risk to the crops cultivated in the new world. On top of this, the local indigenous peoples such as the Kaingang, Xokleng and Guarani were highly resilient and had developed warrior-like cultures, with some nations possessing mastery of horse-riding techniques, as the animal had been introduced to them by Portuguese and Spanish colonizers in the 16th century.

=== 19th century European migration waves ===
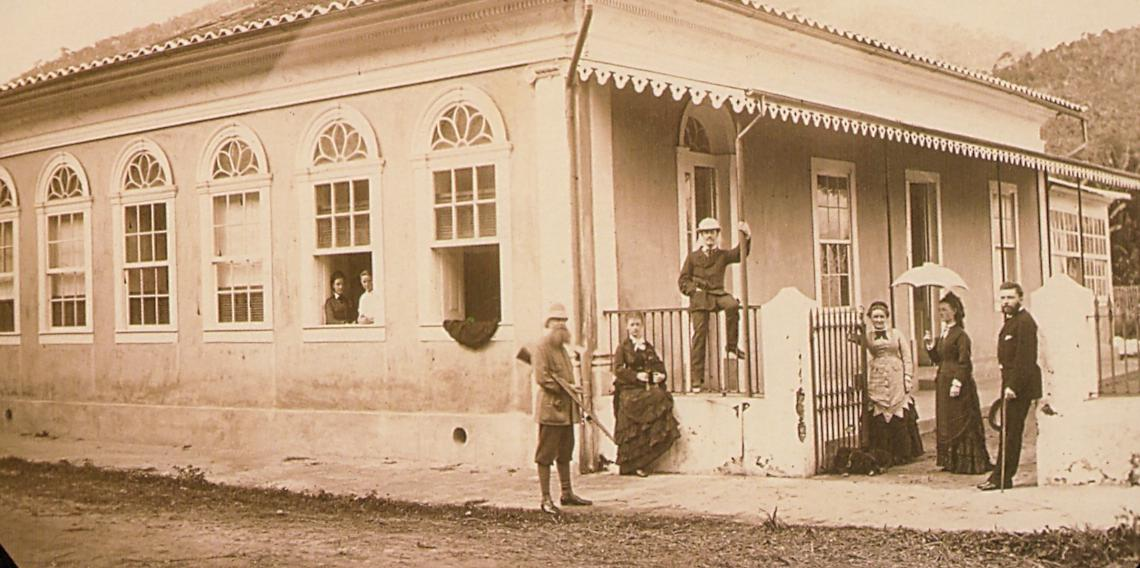
German immigrants in Brazil, 1874.

As such, the population density of the area was very low, with sparse settlements being limited to the valleys by the Serra Gaúcha, eastern Catarinense lowlands and the Curitiba region. However, changes in migration laws in the early 19th century caused by the independence of Brazil from Portugal and the concurrent populational boom and industrial revolution in Europe made the region attractive for European peasants in search of cheap lands. Differently from the Italian and Germans that moved into São Paulo, which was already developed and already fully "owned" by agricultural elites, the European immigrants to the South of Brazil found themselves in an largely empty, promising territory with a climate that was similar to the one of their homeland.

The use of rifles and other gunpowder-based weapons by the new settlers meant they were able to quickly overcome the resistance of local indigenous peoples. Furthermore, the new advancements in farming technology and the cold-resistant crops brought by the immigrants made farming in the region possible and with occasional surplus, meaning that the high birthrates of the settlers would result in massive population growth in the region. Between 1872 and 1890 the population of Paraná grew by 96%, and the one of Santa Catarina grew by 77%.

In order to accommodate these new immigrants to the land and to create a stable, well-organized land division among the new small-scale farmer class, the Brazilian government made the first and only ever agrarian reform in the history of the country, dividing swaths of agricultural property among the settlers.

=== Cultural formation and language ===
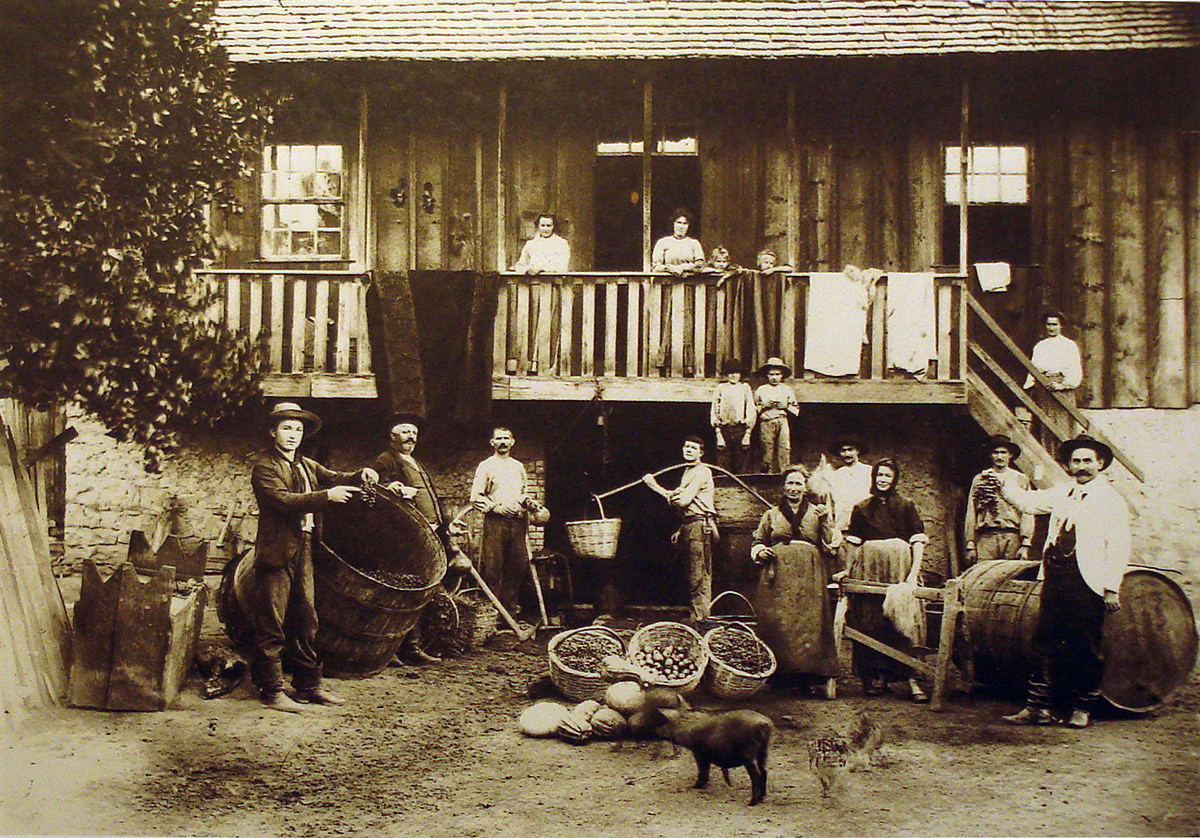
Italian-Brazilians in Caxias do Sul, 1904.

Ethnic groups of origin of these immigrants include the Venetians, Lombardians, Tyroleans, Piedmontese, Emilians, Swiss, Rhinelanders, Pomeranians, Swabians, Poles, Ukrainians and Russians. The wide range of different cultures and languages eventually merged with each other and with the local Brazilians as the generations passed, with intermarriage and cultural syncretism between their traditions and customs, which led to the formation of the Colono people. One factor that helped with the adaptation and avoided the formation of endogamic communities was the fact that the vast majority of the settlers were Roman Catholics, with the small numbers of Orthodox and Lutherans mostly converting to Catholicism in the early 20th century.

Even after 2 or 3 generations, many descendants of immigrants did not speak Portuguese at home, instead using it as a second language that served as a lingua franca to communicate with migrants of other ethnic groups or with other Brazilians. In the efforts of creating a unified national identity in the 1930s, the Vargas government prohibited the use of languages that were not Portuguese in the Brazilian national territory and forced schools across the country to teach in the language. This law led to a massive decrease in the number of speakers of languages such as Venetian, Talian, Hunsrik, Polish, Russian and German. Today, the vast majority of people in Southern Brazil speak solely Portuguese, with minority languages being secluded to small towns and villages in the highlands or elderly people.

== Culture ==
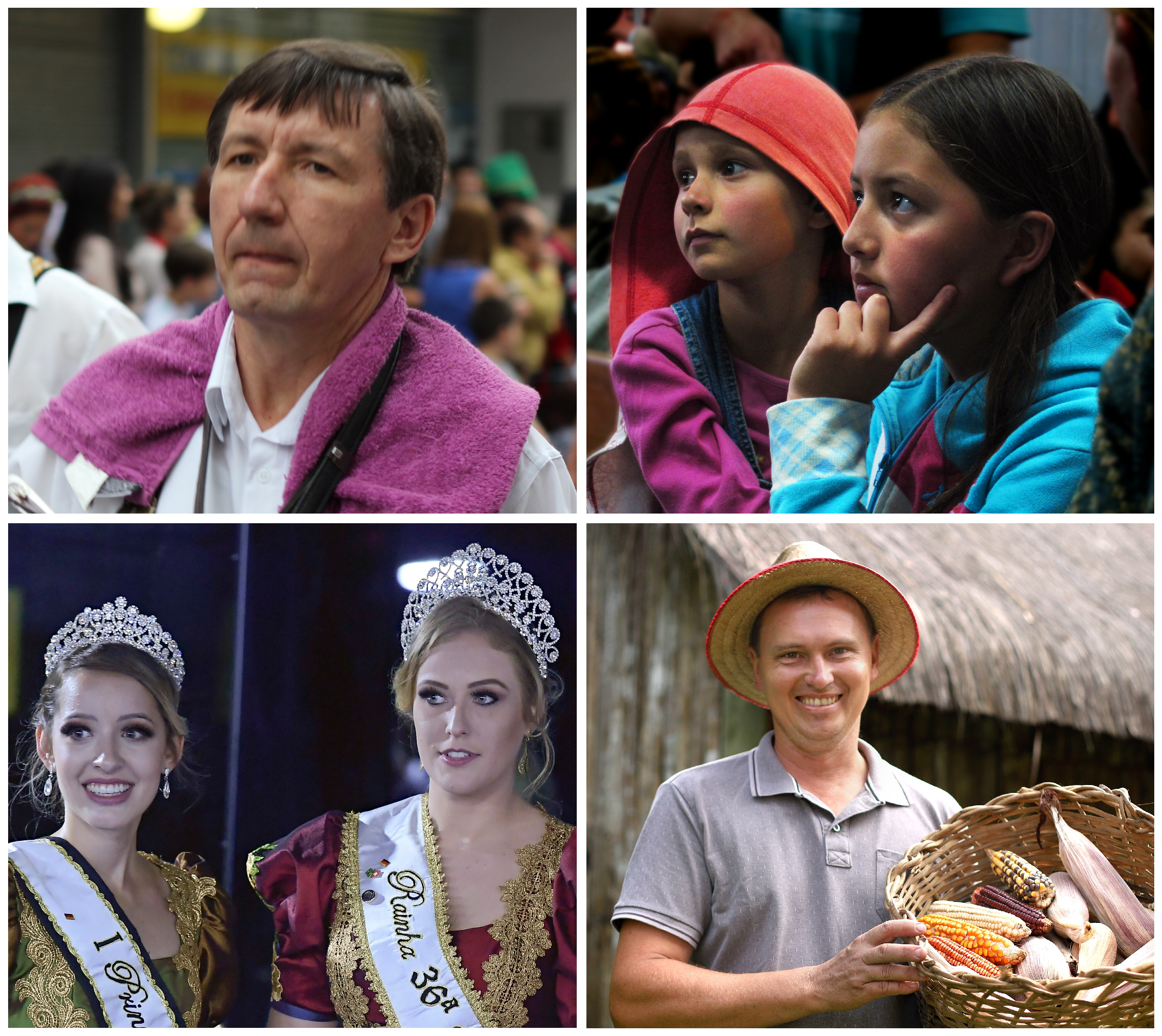
Colonos of various ages and genders.

According to the 2022 Brazilian census the majority of people in the Colono territory are Roman Catholic, numbering at around 70 to 75%, Protestants are 15 to 20% and irreligious people are 4 to 6%. Colonos are one of the Brazilian ethnocultural groups with the highest proportion of Catholics, together with the Mineiros, Geraizeiros and Sertanejos.

Colonos adopted a lot of cultural customs from the local Portuguese-descended cultures that lived in the region before them, including the use of bilineal inheritance of surnames and wealth, Portuguese architecture, overwhelming use of the Portuguese language in all settings of life, comsuption of traditional Brazilian foods and drinks (such as rice with beans and chimarrão) and adoption of some festivities.

Traditional foods of the Colono people include Galeto al Primo Canto, Capeletti Soup, Tortéi, Polenta, Wine Sagu, Eisbein, Cuca, Apfelstrudel, Fondue, Café Colonial, Marreco Recheado, Blumenau Sausage, Entreveiro de Pinhão, Sauerkraut, Radici, Kassler and Goulash.

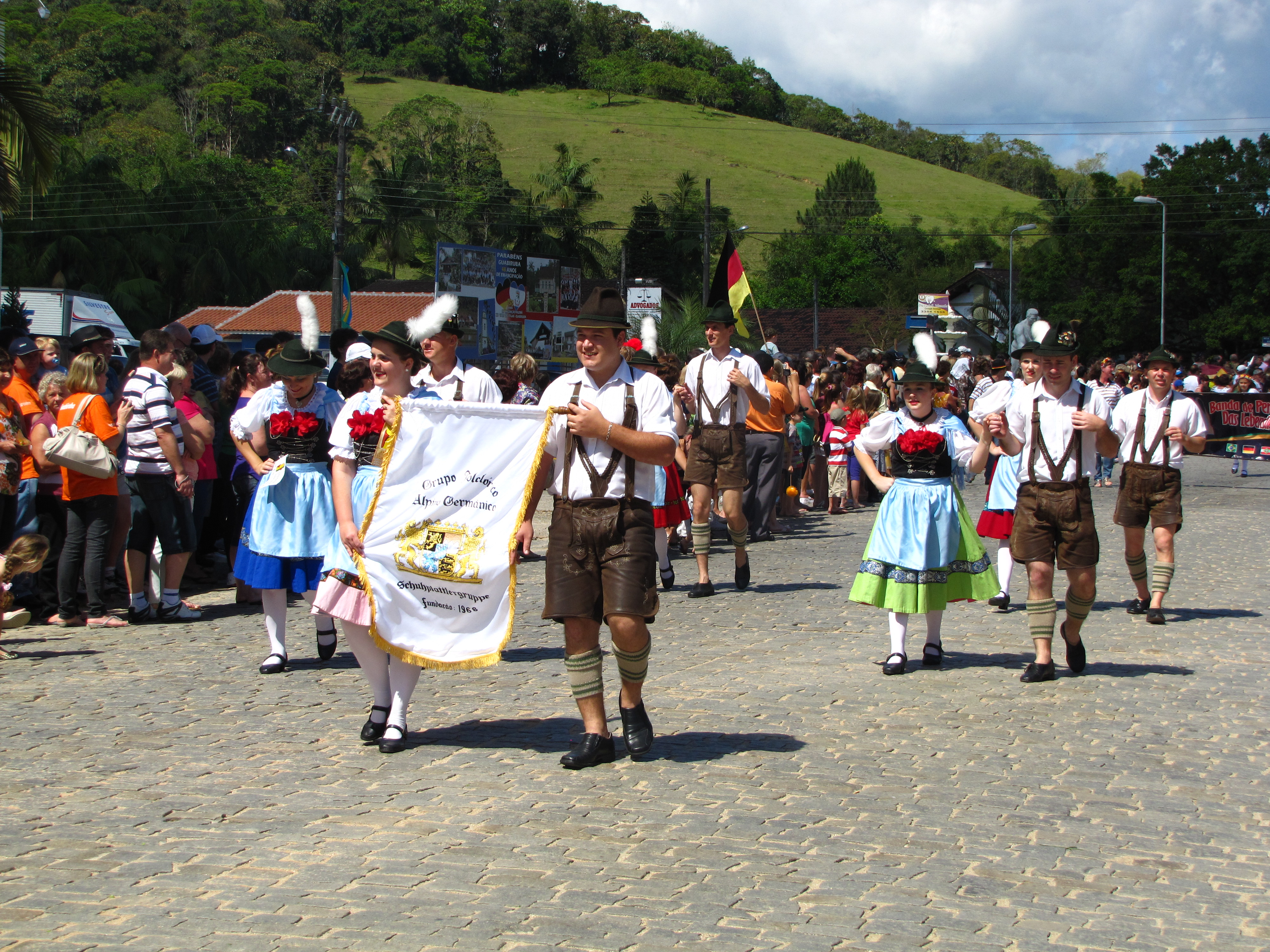
Parade in commemoration for the 150 years of Badenese immigration to Santa Catarina.

Colono festivities, dances and customs include the Festa da Uva, Festa da Cultura Italiana, Festa da Cultura Alemã, Polka, Oktoberfest, Fenavinho, Festival do Capeletti, Volksfest, Tirolerfest, Fenarreco, Schuhplatter, Pau-de-Fitas, German folk music, Kerbfest, Heimatfest and Bierville.

== Genetics ==
Colonos are the Brazilian ethnocultural group with the highest proportion of European ancestry, despite this, its estimated that a little over half of all Colono people have at least 10% of non-European autosomal genetic ancestry, mostly Amerindian, with lower degrees of Subsaharan African. According to the 2022 Brazilian census, most of the population of the Colono heartland identified as White, at 70 to 80%, while 20 to 25% identified as Pardo and 3-5% as Black.

A 2019 systematic scoping review of 51 studies analyzed the autosomal DNA composition of Brazilians from several states and cities and put the average ancestral component of people from the state of Santa Catarina as 80% European, 11% African and 9% Amerindian, and from the people of Paraná as 71% European, 17% African and 12% Amerindian. Another 2013 study put the ancestry of people from Southern Brazil at 74% European, 11% Amerindian and 15% African. These studies also sample populations outside the Colono territory, including the Catarinenses in the coast, Caipiras in the north of Paraná and Gaúchos in the lower half of Rio Grande do sul, all of which have higher proportions of non-European ancestry than the highlanders; when weighted to include only the samples collected in the Colono heartland, ancestry proportions change to around 82% European, 5% African and 13% Amerindian.

== Notable Colonos ==
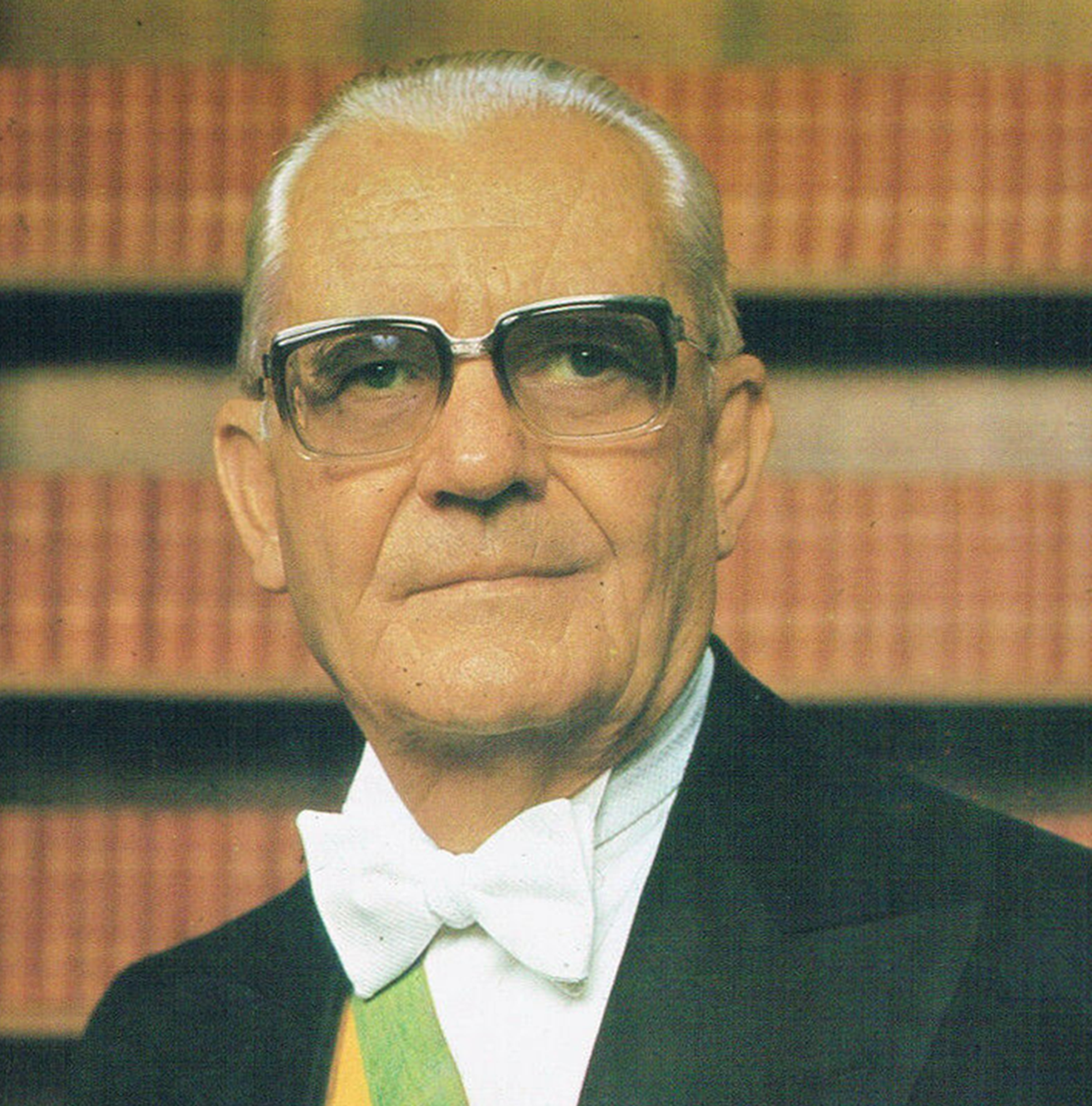
Ernesto Geisel (1907-1996) was the first and only Colono to become president of Brazil. His father's family came from Hesse and his mother's from Lower Saxony.

- Gisele Bündchen - model
- Leonel Brizola - politician
- Michel Teló - musician
- Luiz Felipe Scolari - footballer and manager
- Ernesto Geisel - 29th president of Brazil
- Dunga - footballer and manager
- Cássio - fooballer
- Alisson Becker - footballer
- Falcão - footballer
- Pierre Clostermann - pilot
- Vera Fischer - actress
- Filipe Luís - footballer and manager
- Inri Cristo - astrologer
- Leonardo Boff - writer
- Alexandre Pato - footballer
- Erico Verissimo - writer
- Larissa Manoela - actress
- Paulo Evaristo Arns - archbishop
- Airto Moreira - composer
- Simone Tebet - politician
- Tiago Splitter - basketball player
- César Lattes - physician
- Léo Pereira - footballer
- Rodrigo Hilbert - actor
- Marjorie Estiano - actress
- Juliano Belletti - footballer
- Kéfera Buchmann - youtuber
- Alessandra Ambrosio - model
- Marcia Tiburi - philosopher
