= Fluminense people =

Brazilian ethnic group

Povo Fluminense
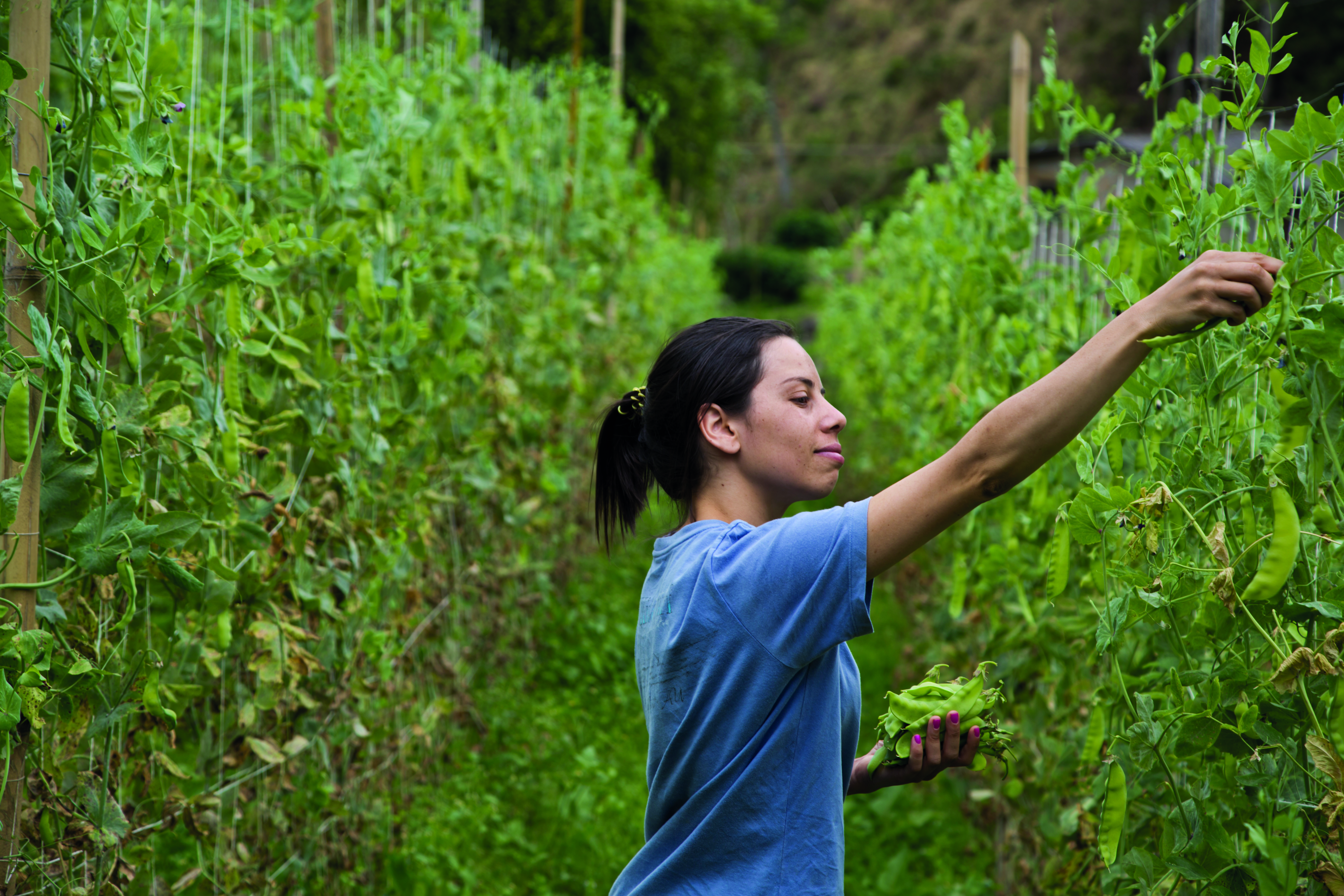
- Fluminense woman in Nova Friburgo, Rio de Janeiro.

Total population
- c. 7 million (2022)

Regions with significant populations
- Brazil

Languages
- Portuguese language, Fluminense dialect

Religion
- Close to evenly split between Roman Catholics and Protestants

Related ethnic groups
- Cariocas, Mineiros, Capixabas, Caipiras, Baianos, Matutos, Portuguese, Tupis, Goitacá and Bantus

The Fluminenses (Natively: [flumiˈnẽsiʃ]) are a Brazilian ethnocultural group distributed across the south of Espírito Santo, southeastern Minas Gerais and most of the state of Rio de Janeiro, with exception of Greater Rio de Janeiro and the western coast cities of Paraty and Angra dos Reis. The Fluminense people are speakers of the Fluminense dialect of Brazilian Portuguese.

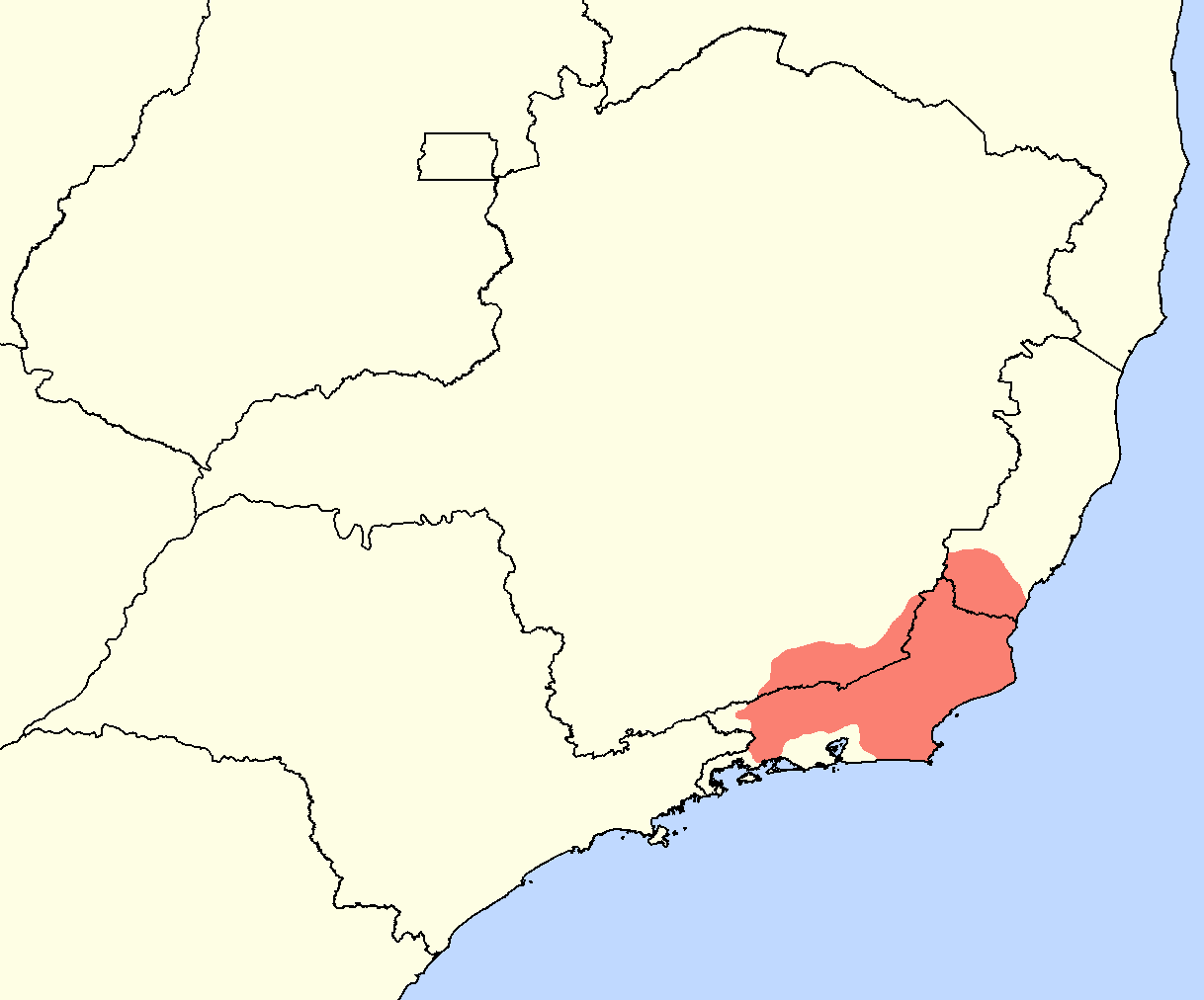
Area inhabited by the Fluminense people (red) over a map of southeastern Brazil.

== History ==
The northern coast of Rio de Janeiro was originally settled by Portuguese colonists in the late 16th century, who mixed to with the local Amerindians of the local Tupinambá, Goitacá and Puri ethnic groups. The low amounts of indigenous ancestry in people of the region today seem to indicate that the indigenous population in Rio de Janeiro was either already low before the Portuguese arrival or were severely affected by the pandemics brought by the Europeans, which would have infected the local population in the early 16th century, before any permanent European settlement was erected.

Despite this, the indigenous customs and traditions influenced the culture of the settlers and led to a formation of a separate cultural identity in the region, giving origin to the Fluminense people. Enslaved Africans from the Congo region and Gulf of Guinea would later be brought to the region for work in sugarcane plantations, eventually mixing with the Fluminenses.

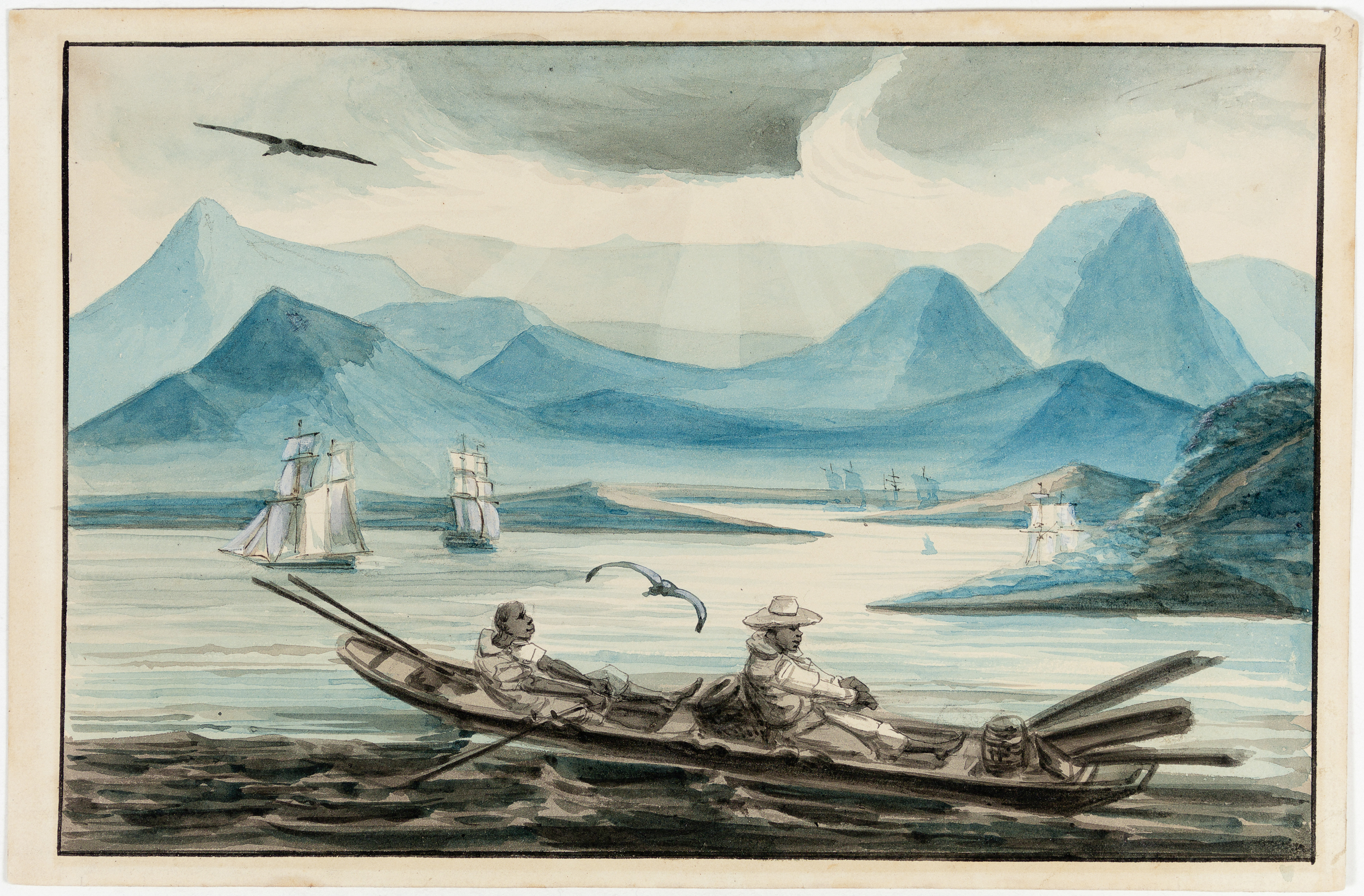
St. John´s Highlands Baie de St. Jean de Macaé. Isle de S. Anna, by Harro Harring, 1840. This painting shows the coast of Macaé, Rio de Janeiro.

At first, only the coastal lowlands of the region were inhabited by non-Amerindians, as the highlands of the Rio de Janeiro province had a harsh terrain that was improper for the cultivation of sugarcane or staple crops used by the Portuguese in amounts high enough to sustain a meaningful population, and the local Puris were aggressive towards explorers that tried to adventure into the mountains.

However, the discovery of gold in the mountains of Minas Gerais in the late 17th century made the Portuguese crown interested in populating the highlands, as it would help with the protection of the new Royal Road, which connected Ouro Preto to the city of Rio de Janeiro. With help of the Portuguese soldiers in massacring the local natives, settlers eventually became confidant enough to establish farms and villages alongside the road, mostly relying on cattle herding as the main economic activity.

Initially, the Guanabara bay and the area where today lies the city of Rio de Janeiro were culturally Fluminense, but the growth and urbanization of the place caused by its promotion to capital of Brazil in 1763 led to a cultural and dialectal differentiation between the city and the rest of the state. In the year of 1808 the Portuguese royal family and court with 12 thousand people moved to Rio de Janeiro in order to escape capture by France during the Napoleonic Wars, moving the capital of the Portuguese Empire to the city and further influencing the local culture, further solidifying the Cariocas as a different people from the Fluminenses.

During the mid and late 19th century the coffee industry became the main economic activity of the Fluminense territory, especially in the highlands. This change brought a great number of slaves to the region and instituted an aristocratic elite of plantation owners that increased the economic inequality in the region, but made it one of the most densely populated and developed areas in the country. After the 1888 abolition of slavery many freed slaves without land or housing moved from the rural areas into the cities and towns such as Volta Redonda, Petrópolis and Juiz de Fora, as well as the Metropolitan Rio.

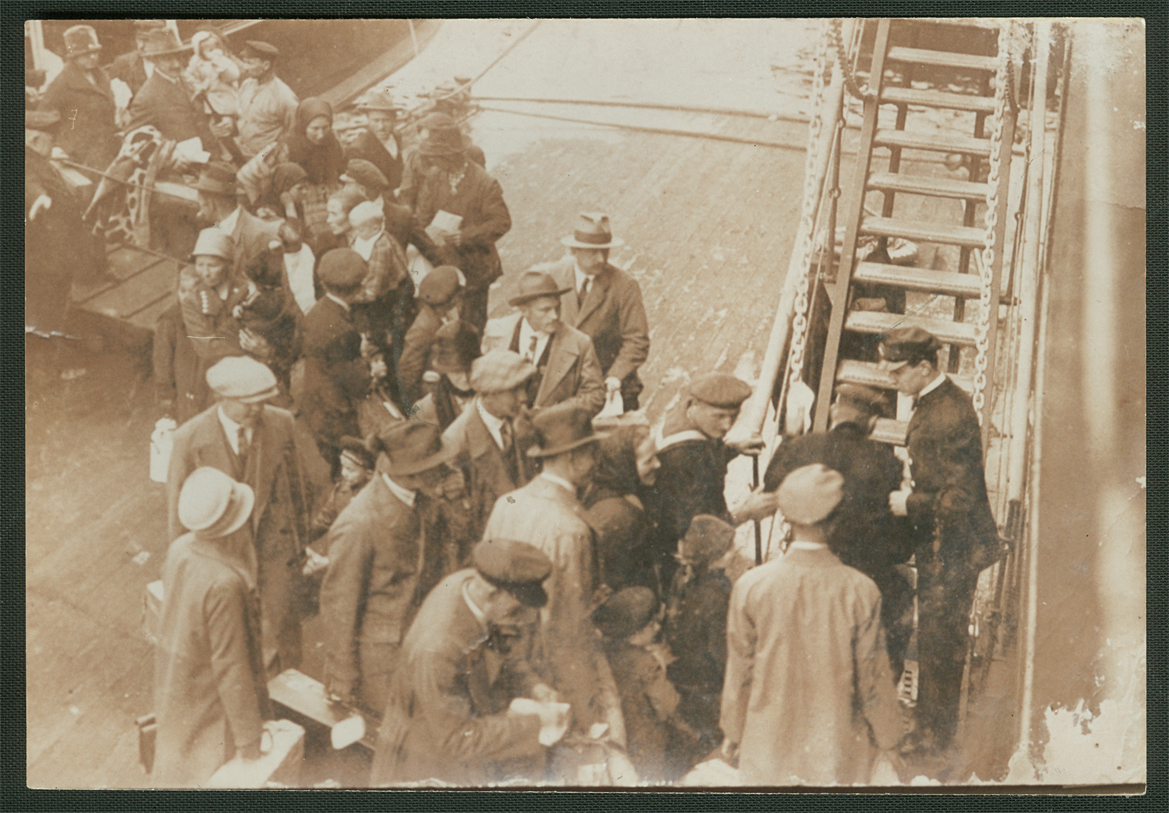
Swiss immigrants board on a ship in Genoa on their way to Nova Friburgo, 1898.

In the 19th century the Fluminense territory deceived a decent amount of Swiss immigrants, especially in Nova Friburgo and its surroundings, as well as smaller numbers of Germans, Finns and Italians. These immigrants were overwhelmingly assimilated into the local culture and abandoned their native languages, being more integrated than those that moved into the Central Espírito Santo highlands and Southern Brazilian highlands, although they still hold some traditions such as Bauernfest.

== Culture ==
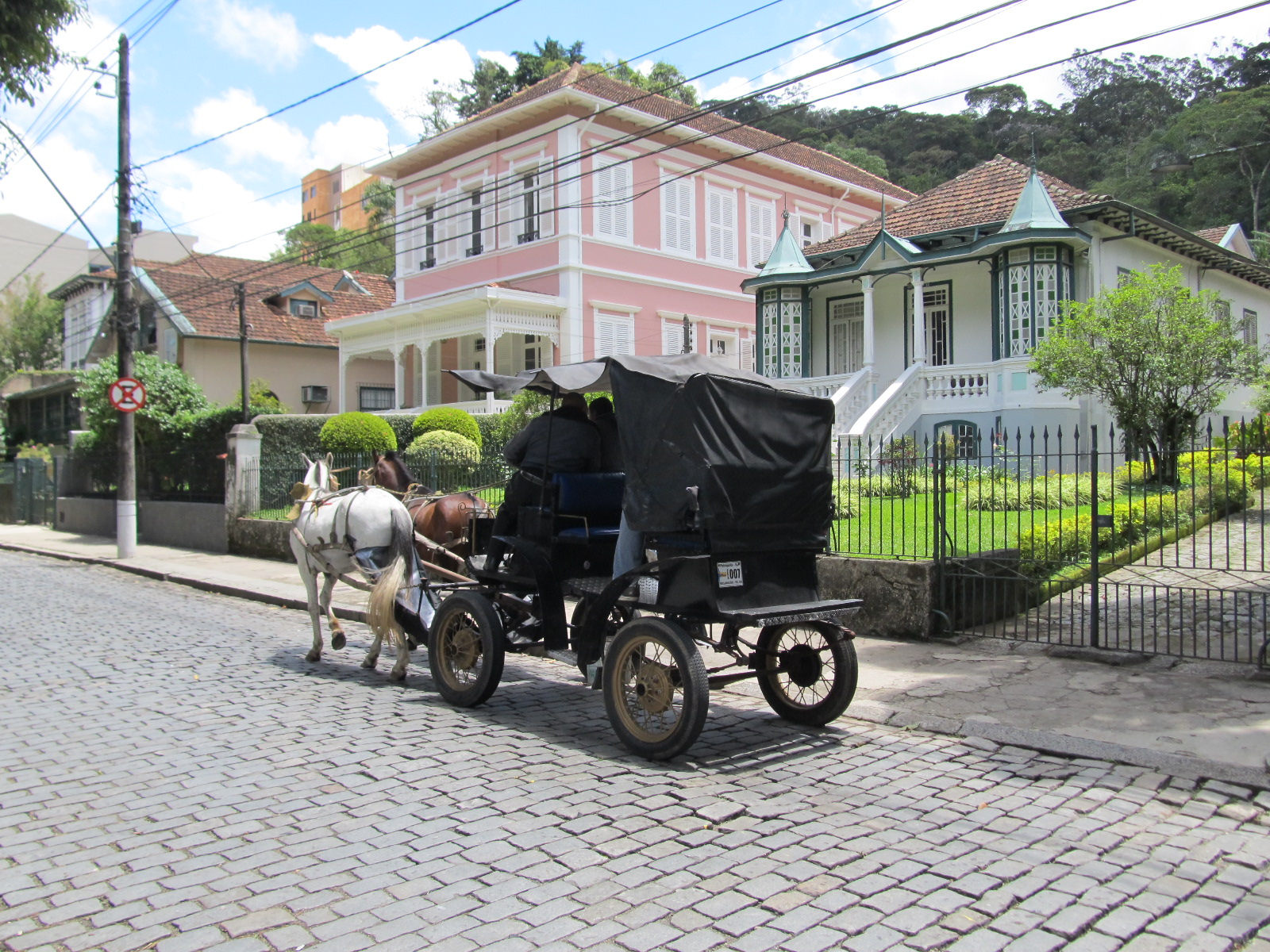
Imperial carriage ride in the city of Petrópolis.

Historically Fluminenses were overwhelmingly Catholic, but in recent decades the numbers of Protestants and irreligious people have grown steadily. As of 2022, Catholics made up less than half of the Fluminense population at 45%, Protestants came next at 35%, irreligious people at 12% and Spiritists at 4%.

Traditional dishes and food of the Fluminense people include Aipim com Carne de Sol, Fondue, Joelho de Porco, Tutu a Mineira, Raclete, Strudel, Trout, Vaca Atolada, Café Colonial, Cordon Bleu, Rösti, Sauerkraut, Nhoque, German beers, Karjalanpiirakka, Maksalaatikko and Chuvisco. Music, dances and traditions of the Fluminenses include Carnaval, Folia de Reis, Jongo music, Seresta music, Bauernfest, hiking, Colonial music, Boi de Samba and several novenas for Catholic saints.

== Genetics ==
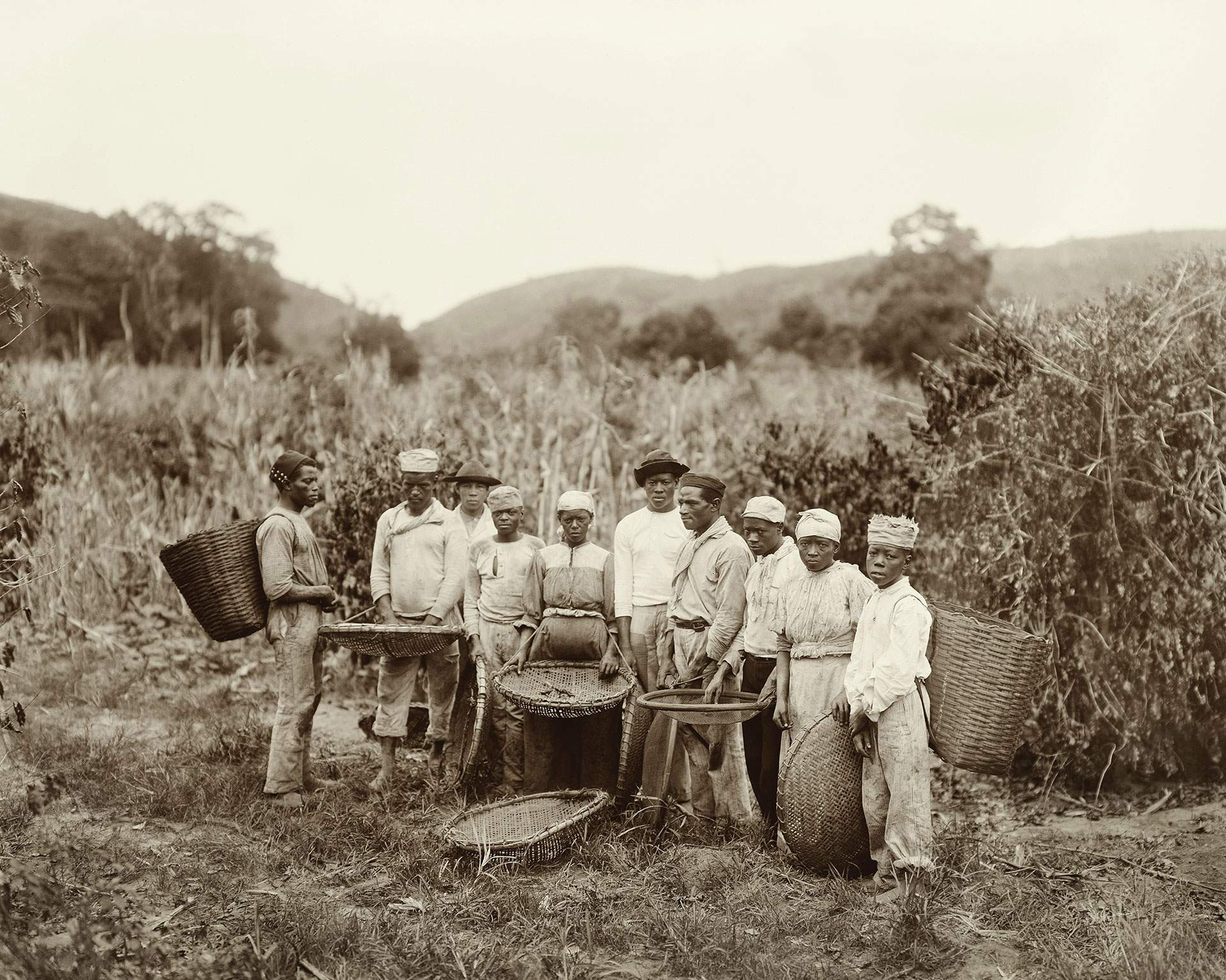
African slaves working in a coffee plantation in the Paraíba Valley, Rio de Janeiro, 1882.

According to the 2022 Brazilian census the majority of people in the Fluminense territory self-identified as white, at around 50%, pardos came next at 35 to 40% and blacks at 10 to 15%. Race mixing among Flumineneses is common, and a considerable chunk of their families have people of different races in it. The autosomal genetic ancestry of Fluminense people is estimated to be around 68% European, 27% African and 5% Amerindian.

== Notable Fluminenses ==
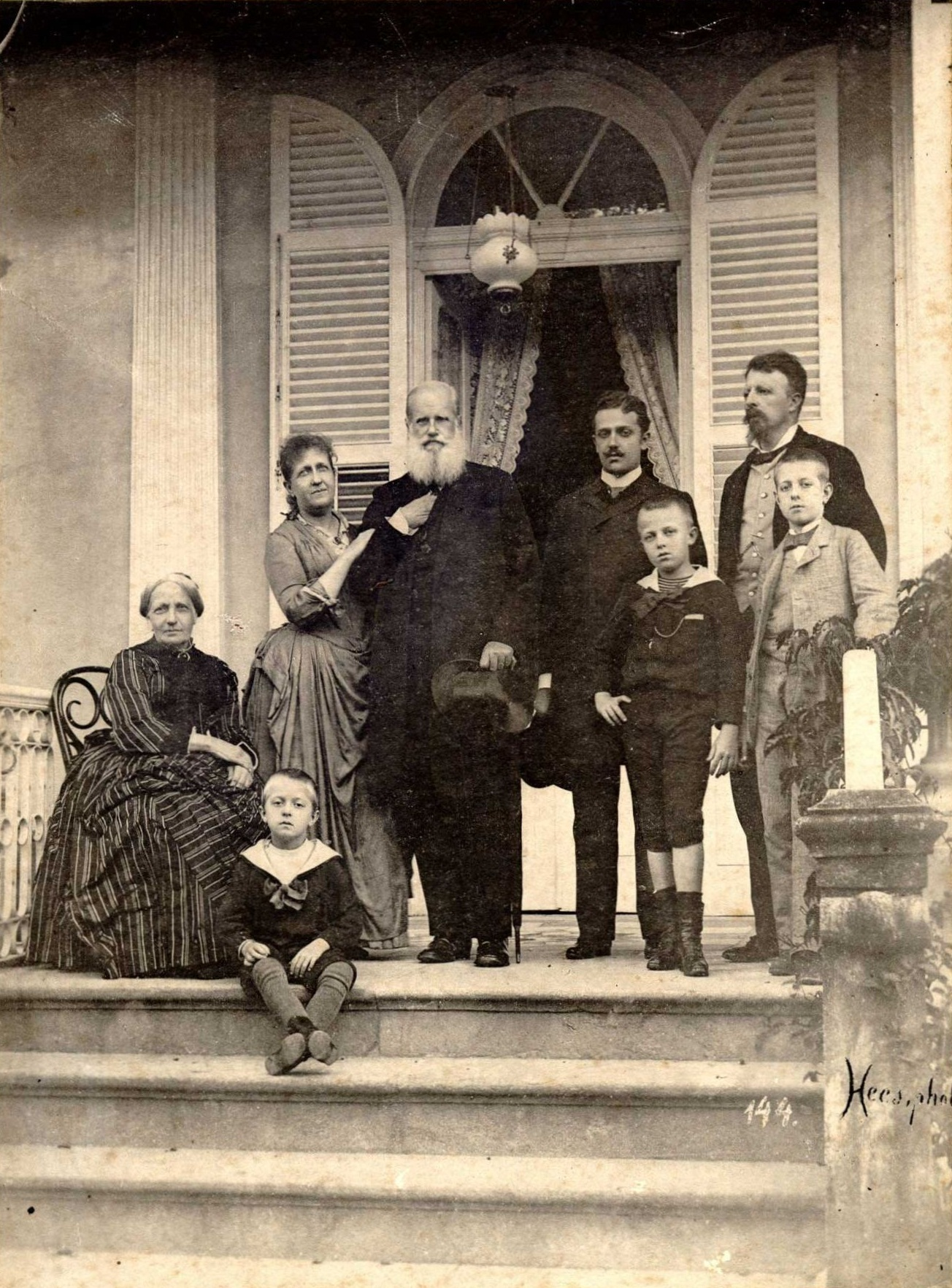
- During the Brazilian Empire the royal family spent 5 to 6 months of every year in the Fluminense city of Petrópolis, making them culturally both Carioca and Fluminense.
  Dom Pedro II - 2nd emperor of Brazil
- Garrincha - footballer
- Princess Isabel - princess of Brazil
- Nilo Peçanha - 7th president of Brazil
- Euclides da Cunha - writer
- Luís of Orléans-Braganza - prince of Brazil
- Washington Luís - 13th president of Brazil
- Roberto Carlos - singer
- Edir Macedo - businessman
- Casimiro de Abreu - poet
- Baden Powell - musician
- Rodrigo Santoro - actor
- Danilo - footballer
- Fagundes Varela - poet
- José do Patrocínio - writer
- Carlos Lacerda - politician
- Herivelto Martins - composer
- Felipe Melo - footballer
- Clementina de Jesus - musician
- Egberto Gismonti - composer
- Rubem Fonseca - writer
- Benito di Paula - musician
- Stênio Garcia - actor
- Fernando Gabeira - politician
- Ramires - footballer
- Sebastião Lazaroni - football manager
