= Catarinense people =

Brazilian ethnic group

Povo Catarinense
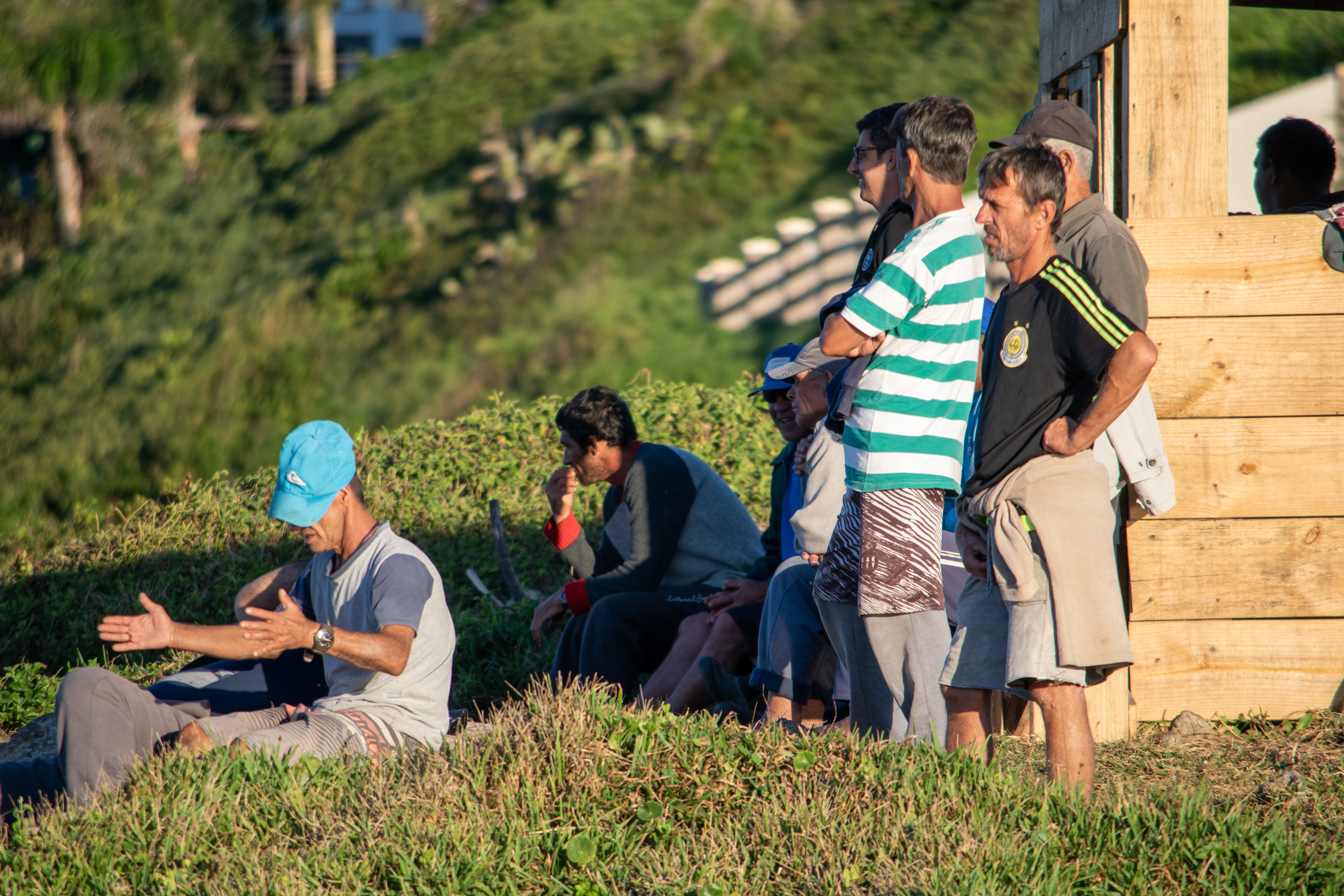
- Catarinense men in Garopaba, 2019

Total population
- c. 3 million (2022)

Regions with significant populations
- Brazil

Languages
- Portuguese language, Manézinho and Gaúcho dialects

Religion
- Predominantly Roman Catholic, sizeable Protestant minority

Related ethnic groups
- Colonos, Gauchos, Caiçaras, Caipiras, Azoreans and Guaranis

The Catarinenses (Natively: [kɐtɐɾiˈnẽsis]) also known as Açorianos-Brasileiros are an ethnocultural group distributed across the coast of the Southern Brazilian states of Santa Catarina and Rio Grande do Sul. The Catarinense people are mostly descended from Portuguese Azorean immigrants, with some assimilation of later Italians and Germans; they are speakers of the Manézinho and Gaúcho dialects of Brazilian Portuguese.

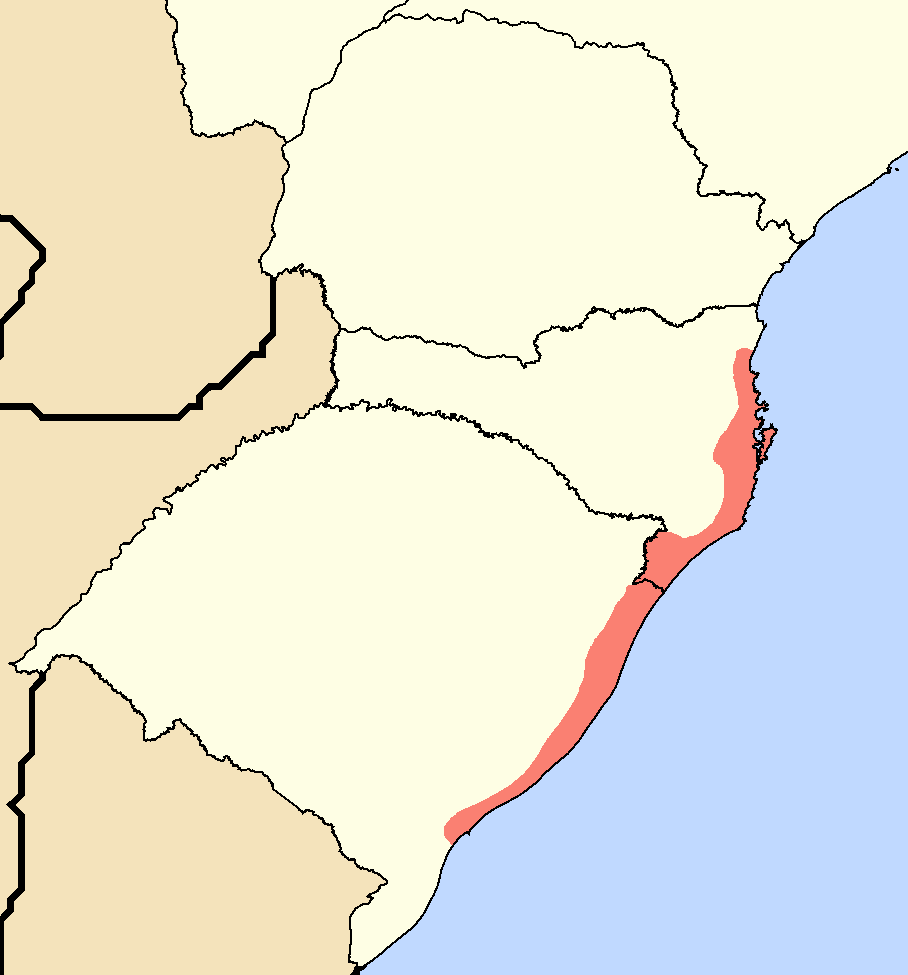
Area inhabited by the Catarinenses (red) over a map of southern Brazil.

== History ==
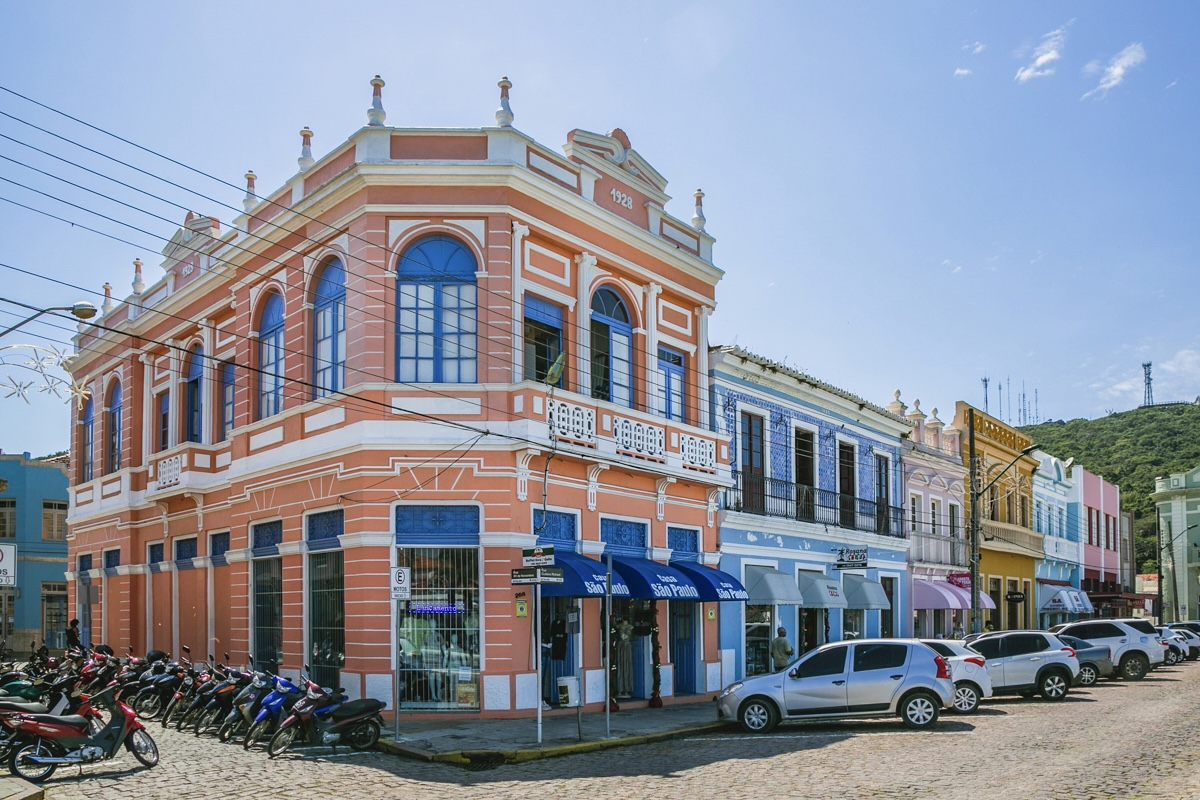
Azorean architecture in Laguna, Santa Catarina.

The Catarinense people originated in the late 18th century from the adaptation of the Azorean immigrants to life in the Southern Brazilian coast and their mixture with the local Indigenous Guaranis, with a minor later mixture and cultural influence of Subsaharan African, Italian and German sources.

Differently from the tropical and equatorial climate of most of Brazil, the coast of Santa Catarina and Rio Grande do Sul had a climate and geography that was rather similar to that of the Portuguese Atlantic islands, with temperate oceanic to humid subtropical temperatures, windy and rainy weather and the presence of many natural harbors and prime fishing waters.

The economy of the Catarinenses was based on fishing, subsistence farming of local American crops such as corn and cassava, and the hunting of whales for the extraction of whale oil. As such, the Catarinense people and their culture is deeply rooted in the sea and navigation, similarly to that of the original Azorean settlers and other Portuguese ethnocultures.

Beginning in the mid to late 19th century, the states of Santa Catarina, Paraná and Rio Grande do Sul began to receive large European migration waves. The Vale Catarinense region was settled by mostly Venetian, Lombardian, Pomeranian, Swiss and Rhinelander immigrants, changing the local culture to that of what would later become the Colono people of inner Southern Brazil, outnumbering the sporadic Catarinense settlements and farms present in the area and founding cities such as Blumenau, Brusque and Joinville, as a result, the Catarinense territory nowadays is solely in the coastal areas. European immigrants that settled in the more densely populated coast and Florianópolis region, however, were assimilated to the culture of the Catarinense people.

== Culture ==
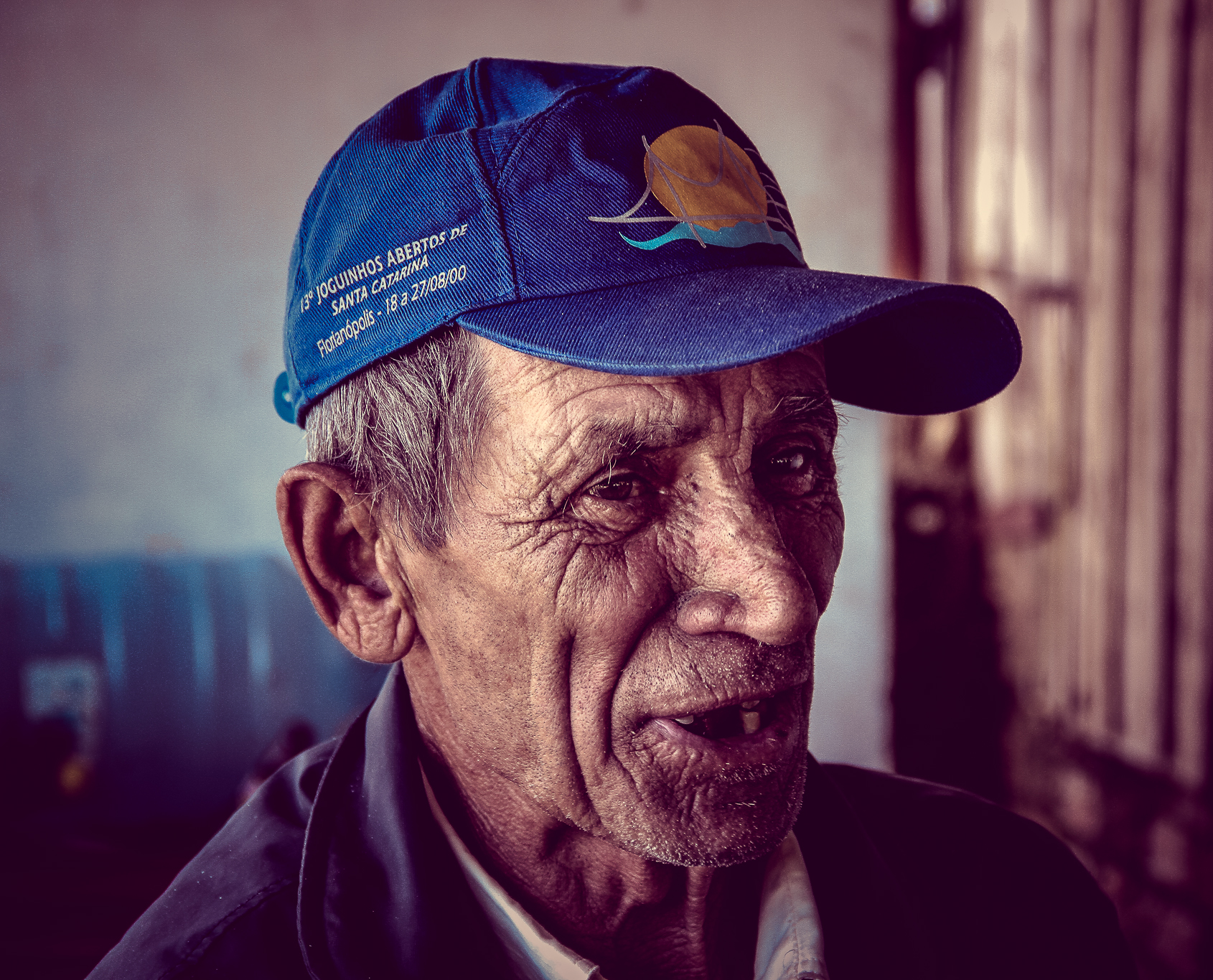
Traditional Catarinense fisherman in the island of Florianópolis.

Traditions and festivities of the Catarinense people include Boi de Mamão, Benzeduras, Festa do Divino Espírito Santo, Renda de Bilros, Procissão do Senhor dos Passos, Terno de Reis, Festa da Safra da Tainha and the very act of fishing. Traditional dishes and foods include oyster, Tainha fish, Pirão, shrimps and Pastel de Berbigão.

Catarinenses are traditionally deeply Catholic, but in recent decades the numbers of irreligious people and Protestants has increased among them. The 2022 Brazilian census put the number of Catholics in the coast of Santa Catarina and Rio Grande do Sul at 55 to 65%, Protestants at 20 to 25% and irreligious people at 10 to 15%.

== Genetics ==
According to the 2022 Brazilian census 15 to 20% of the population of the Catarinense territory self-identified as pardo, 75 to 80% as white and 5 to 8% as black. A 2014 genetic study analyzed the autosomal DNA composition of Brazilians from Santa Catarina and put the average ancestral component of people from the Florianópolis metropolitan zone as 84% European, 6% Amerindian and 10% African.

== Notable Catarinenses ==
- Anita Garibaldi - revolutionary
- Manuel Luís Osório - military officer
- Guga - tennist
- Cellbit - streamer and game developer
- Jorginho - footballer
- Cruz e Sousa - poet
- Rita Lobato - physician
- Menotti Garibaldi - general
- Victor Meirelles - painter
- Lauro Müller - politician
- Heitor Pereira - composer
- Golbery do Couto e Silva - general
- Aloísio dos Santos Gonçalves - footballer
- Leandro Machado - footballer
- Fernando Scherer - swimmer
