= Paulistano people =

Brazilian ethnic group

Povo Paulistano
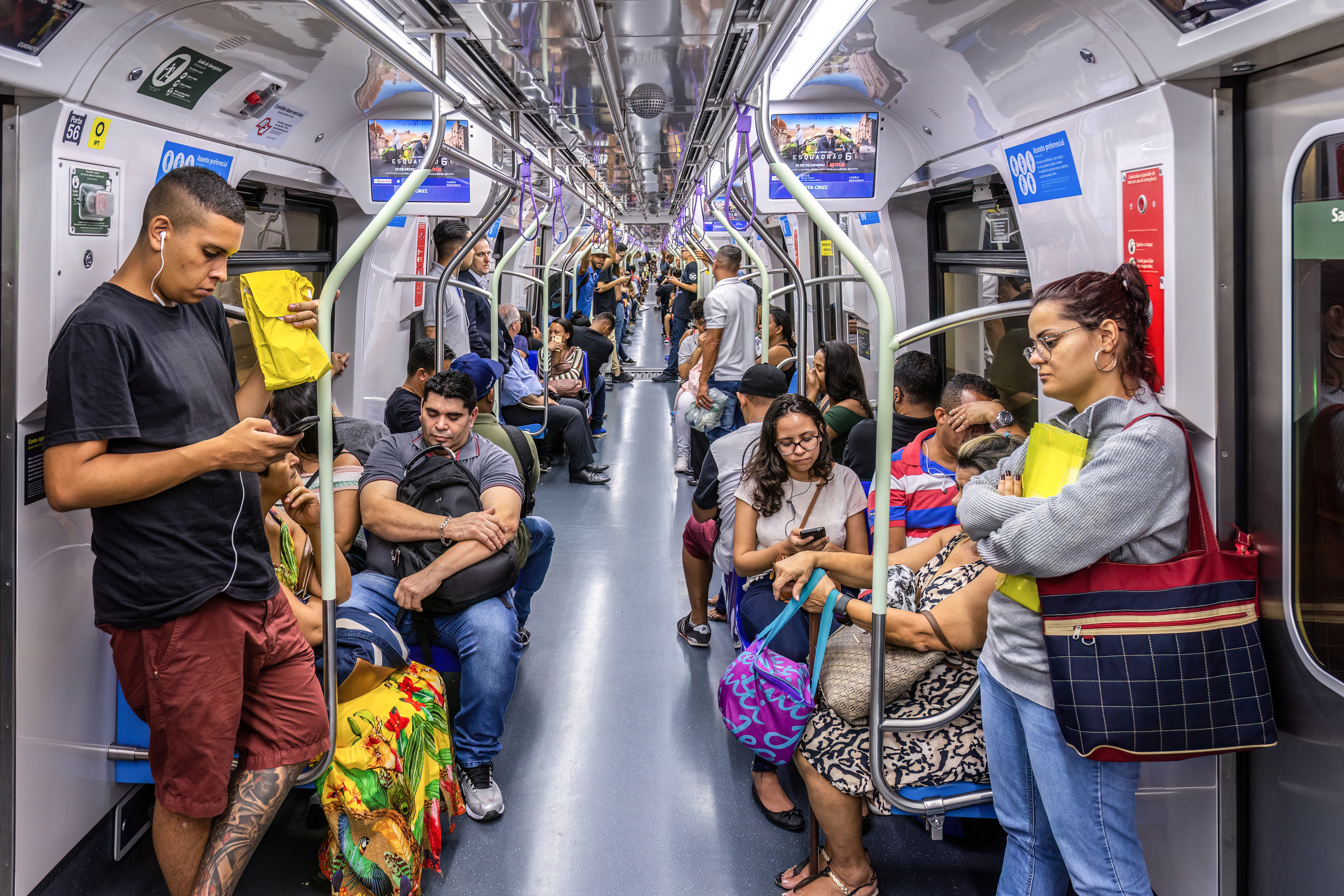
- Paulistanos in the São Paulo subway, 2019.

Total population
- c. 20-22 million (2022)

Regions with significant populations
- Brazil

Languages
- Portuguese language, Paulistano dialect

Religion
- Predominantly Roman Catholic, sizeable Protestant minority

Related ethnic groups
- Caipiras, Mineiros, Fluminenses, Caiçaras, Portuguese, Italians, Tamoios, Tupiniquims, Bantus and Yorubas

The Paulistanos (Natively: [pɐwlisˈtɐ̃nus]) are a Brazilian ethnocultural group distributed across the Greater São Paulo region and parts of the coast of the São Paulo state; they are speakers of the Paulistano dialect of Brazilian Portuguese.

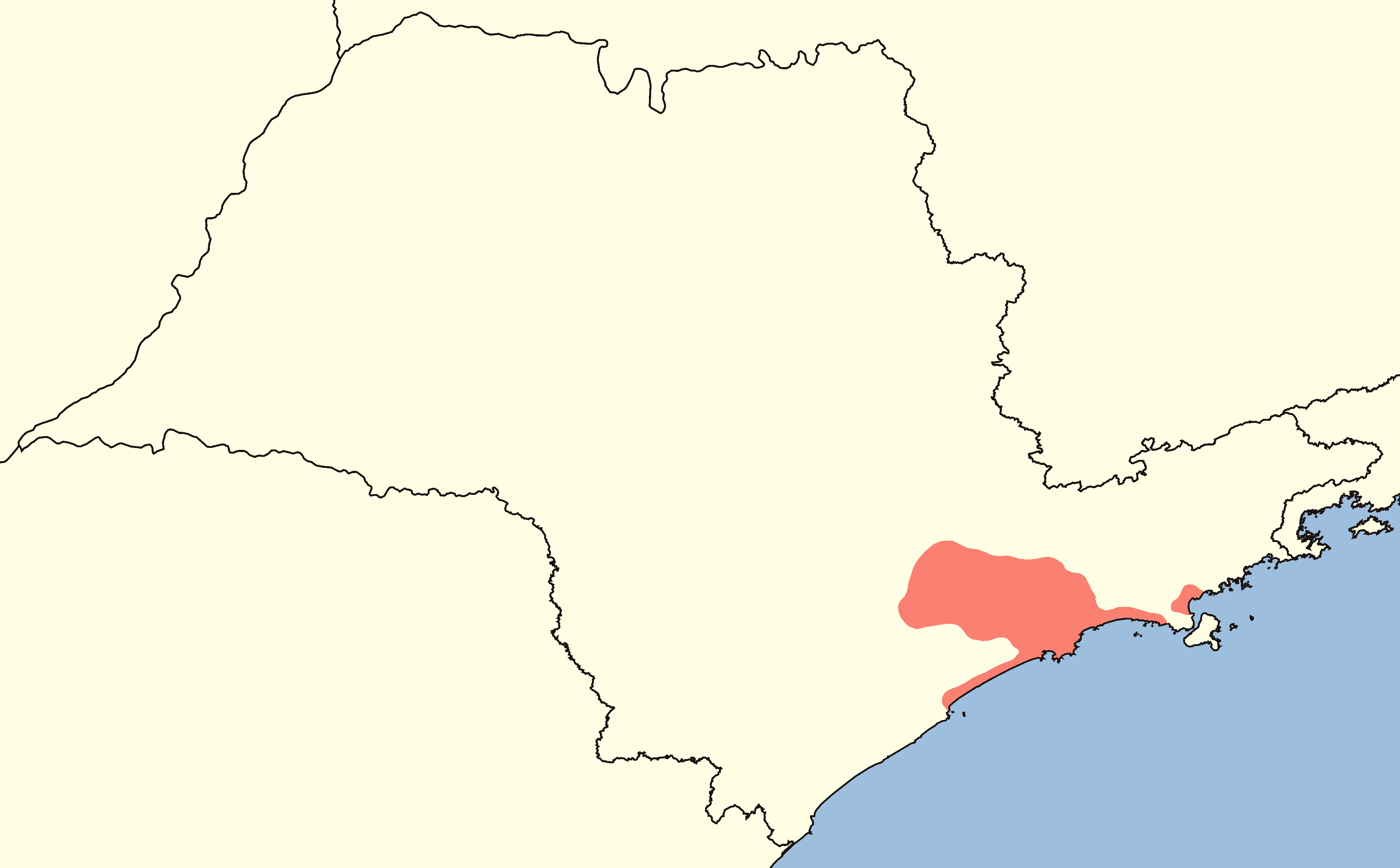
Area inhabited by the Paulistano people (red) over a map of the state of São Paulo.

== History ==
The valley where São Paulo is located was initially settled by Portuguese settlers in the late 16th century, these colonizers mixed with the populations of local indigenous peoples from the Tamoio, Tupiniquim, Guaianá and Puri ethnicities, and later with enslaved Africans brought from the Congo and Gulf of Guinea. The mixing between these populations gave origin to the Caipira culture, which would later be spread north across the rest of the captaincy of São Paulo by the Bandeirantes.

Beginning in the 19th century, the city of São Paulo passed through a great amount of populational growth driven by several migration waves from other provinces of Brazil and countries in Europe. These migration waves and change from the lifestyle of a semi-rural town to large city caused the culture of the region to morph away from that of the Caipiras, becoming its own ethnocultural group.

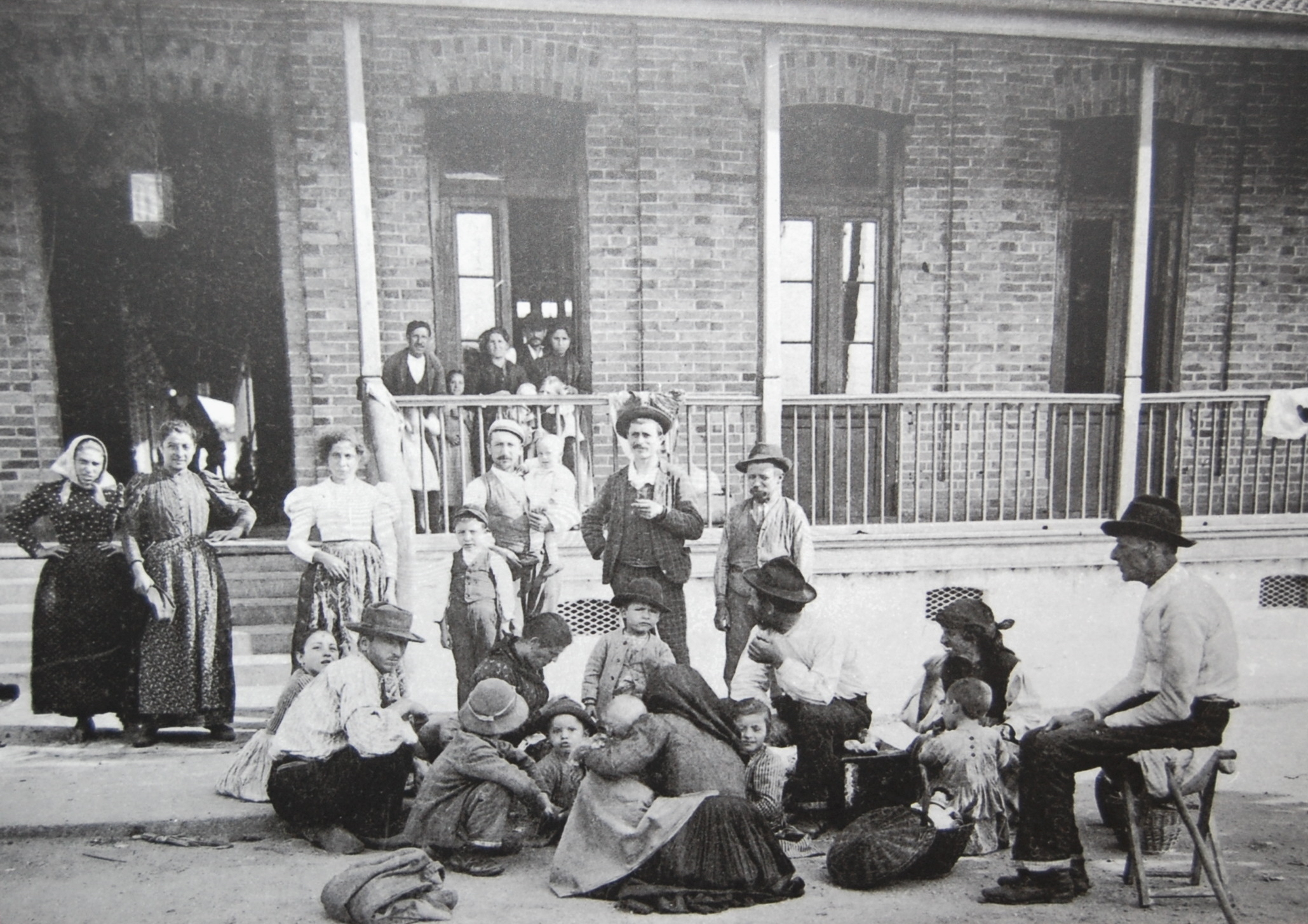
Italian immigrants in São Paulo, 1890.

The first major migration wave into the city occurred in the mid to late 1800s, when the region received a great amount of immigrants from the Northern region of the Kingdom of Italy, including peoples such as the Venetians, Piedmontese, Lombards and Emilians. The Italians greatly changed the local culinary, culture and way of speaking, leading to the formation of the Paulistano dialect.

Later major immigrant groups include the Spaniards, Germans and Japanese in the early 1900s, Lebanese and Syrians in the mid-1900s and Sertanejos, Matutos and Baianos in the mid to late 1900s, as well as constant flows of Caipiras moving from the countryside and rest of the state to the city of São Paulo in search for work in industry and construction. The overwhelming majority of descendants of these migrants were assimilated to the local culture and adopted the local language and dialect.

== Culture ==
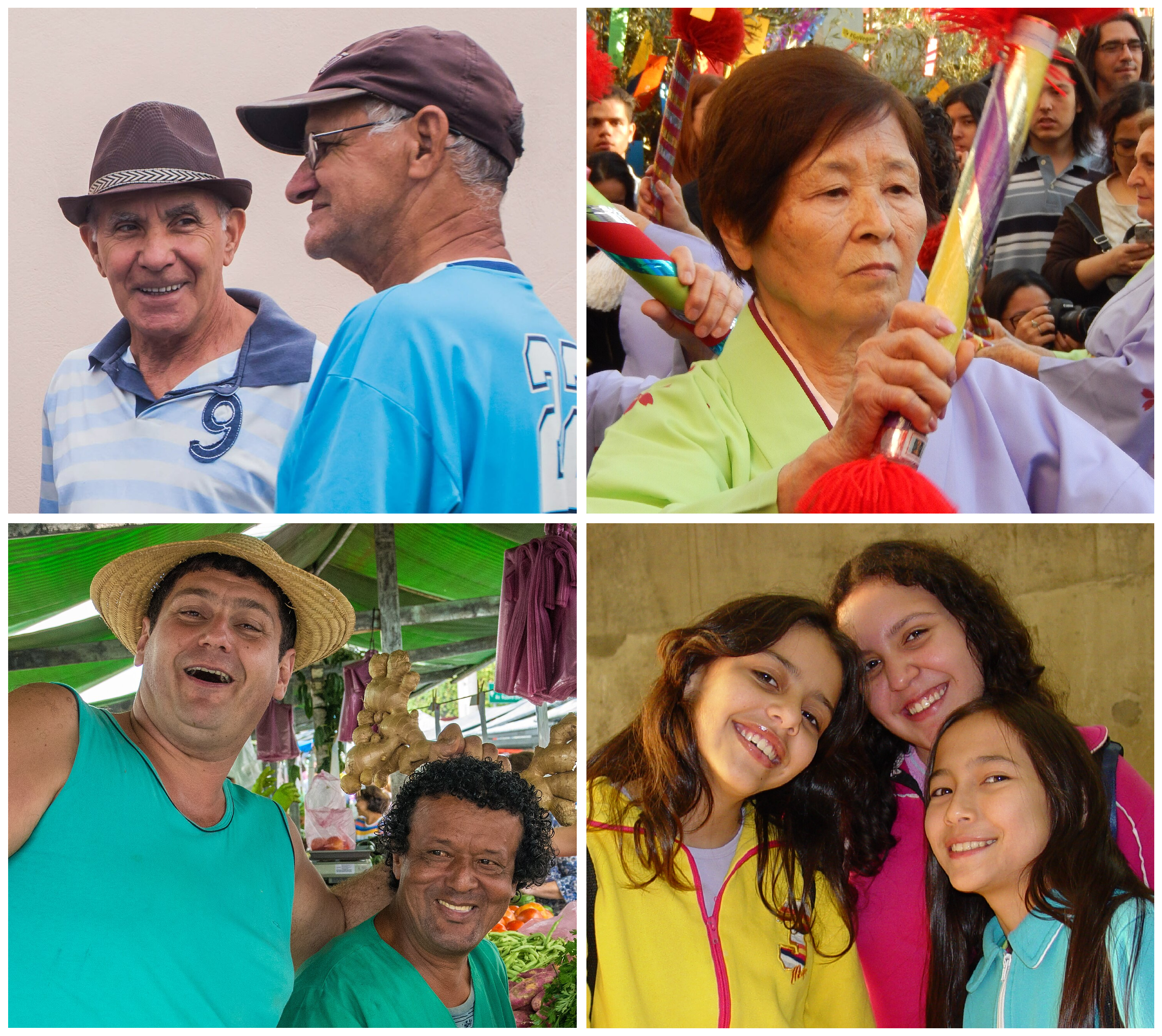
People from the São Paulo metropolitan zone.

The culture of the Paulistanos is the most cosmopolitan of the Brazilian cultures, as it derives from customs and traditions from widely different and diverse peoples spanning across all the continents in the world. As such, the Paulistanos have the presence of traditions, dishes and religions that are very uncommon to non existent in the rest of the country.

The São Paulo metropolitan zone is the part of Brazil with the highest amount of Buddhists, Jews, Orthodox Christians and Muslims in the country. The 2022 census put Catholics as the largest religious group in the Paulistano territory, numbering 49%, followed by Protestants at 26%, irreligious people at 13%, followers of Umbanda and Candomblé at 2% and Spiritists, Muslims, Jews, Orthodox Christians and Buddhists at 1% or less.

Cultural festivities of the Paulistanos include Carnaval, São Vito, Festa de Nossa Senhora Achiropita, Sakura Matsuri, Tanabata Matsuri, Festa de Nossa Senhora de Casaluce, Festa de San Gennaro and Congada. Traditional foods include Virado à Paulista, Sanduíche de Mortadela, Cuscuz Paulista, Pastel, Bolovo, Hotdog with mashed potatoes, Brazilian Pizza, Bauru and Sonho.

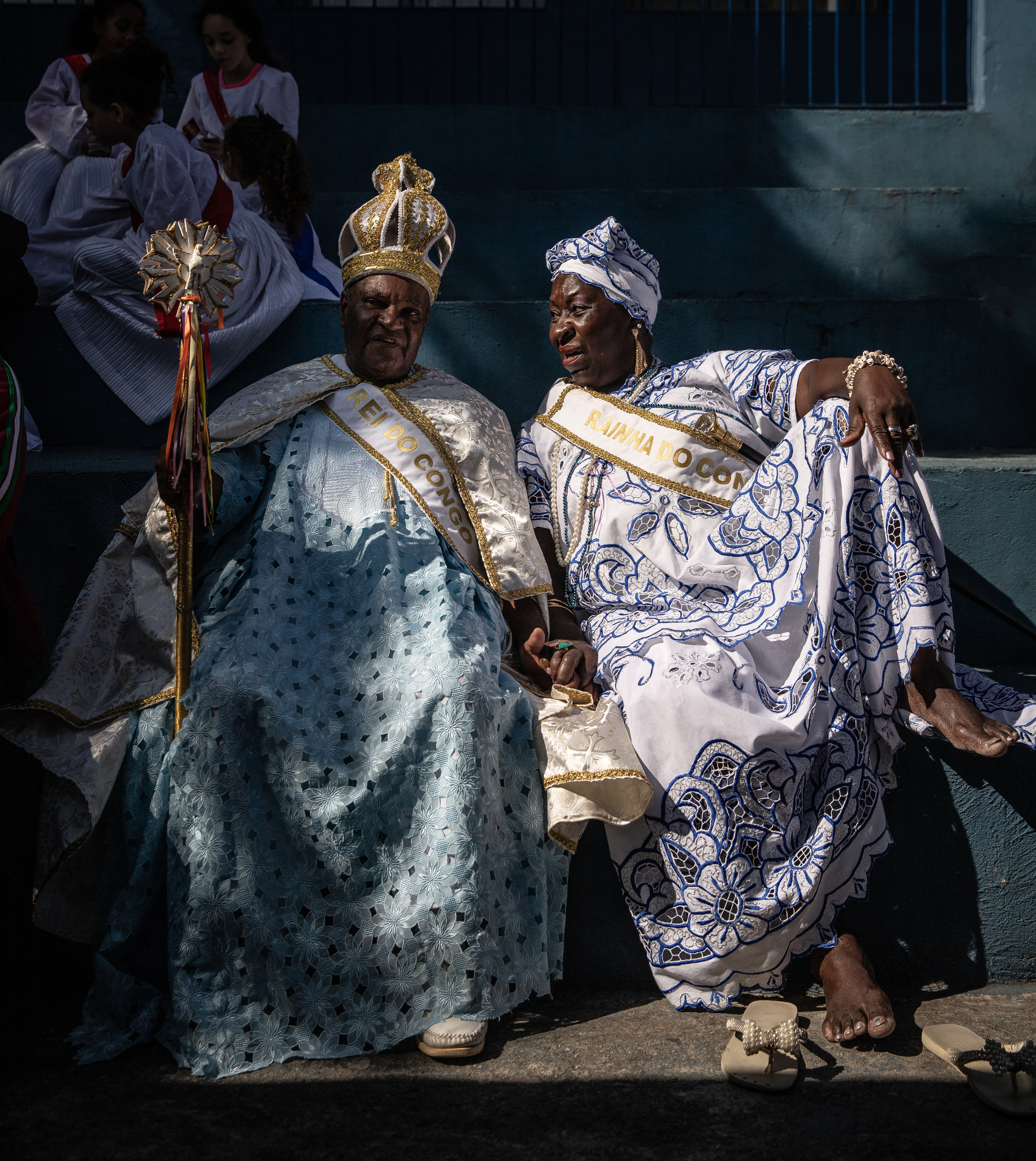
King and Queen of the Congo in a traditional Congada festivity, Cotia.

== Genetics ==
According to the 2022 Brazilian census 36% of the population of Paulistanos self-identified as pardo, 52% as white, 10% as black and 2% as Asian. Most Paulistanos are mixed to some degree, with varying rates of European, Levantine, African, East Asian or Amerindian ancestry. A 2019 systematic scoping review of 51 studies analyzed the autosomal DNA composition of Brazilians from several states and cities and put the average ancestral component of people from the city of São Paulo as 67% European (including Levantine), 22% African, 9% Amerindian and 2% East Asian.

== Notable Paulistanos ==
- Neymar Júnior - footballer
- Ayrton Senna - formula 1 driver
- Cafu - footballer
- Mário de Andrade - writer
- Robinho - footballer
- José Bonifácio de Andrada e Silva - politician and polymath
- João Gordo - musician
- Rita Lee - musician
- Fernando Haddad - politician
- Bartolomeu de Gusmão - priest
- David Luiz - footballer
- José Serra - politician
- Mano Brown - musician
- Antony - fooballer
- Luciano Huck - television presenter
- Willian - footballer
- Lord Vinheteiro - pianist
- Kondzilla - musician
- Supla - musician
- Afonso Schmidt - writer
- Alexandre Borges - actor
- Éverton Ribeiro - footballer
