= Swiss-German =

Swiss-German may refer to:

- pertaining to Germany–Switzerland relations
- variously, used ambiguously:
  - Germans in Switzerland, see German immigration to Switzerland
  - Swiss in Germany, see Swiss_abroad#Germany
  - the Swiss German language
  - German-speaking Swiss people, see German-speaking Switzerland

== See also ==
- German Swiss (disambiguation)
