= Bauernfest =

Festival in Petrópolis, Brazil

Coordinates: 22°30′18″S 43°10′44″W

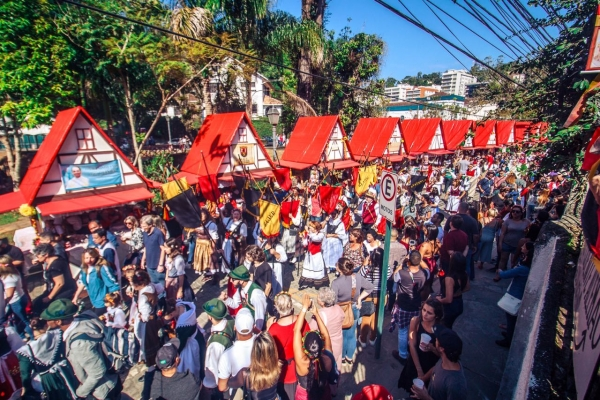
- Center of Petrópolis during the event, in 2018.
- Observed by: Petrópolis, Rio de Janeiro
- Type: Cultural
- Duration: 7-10 days
- Frequency: Annual
- Related to: Oktoberfest

Bauernfest (also called the Festival of the German Settlers) is a festival of Germanic traditions that takes place in the city of Petrópolis, in highlands region of the state of Rio de Janeiro. The festivities occurs since the period of the Germanic colonization, but only gaining form in the 20th century. It occurs annually during the month of July.

Since 1989 the Bauernfest has been held every year (except 2020) in the city center. It is considered the largest festival in the Petrópolis region, and the second largest German festival in Brazil, behind the Oktoberfest of Blumenau, in Santa Catarina. The festival features folk dances, choirs, traditional bands such as the Banda Musical Germânica (Germanic Musical Band) of Blumenau, contest beer drinking. Typical savory foods include sausages, Sauerkraut, Wurstsalat, Sauerbraten and so forth.

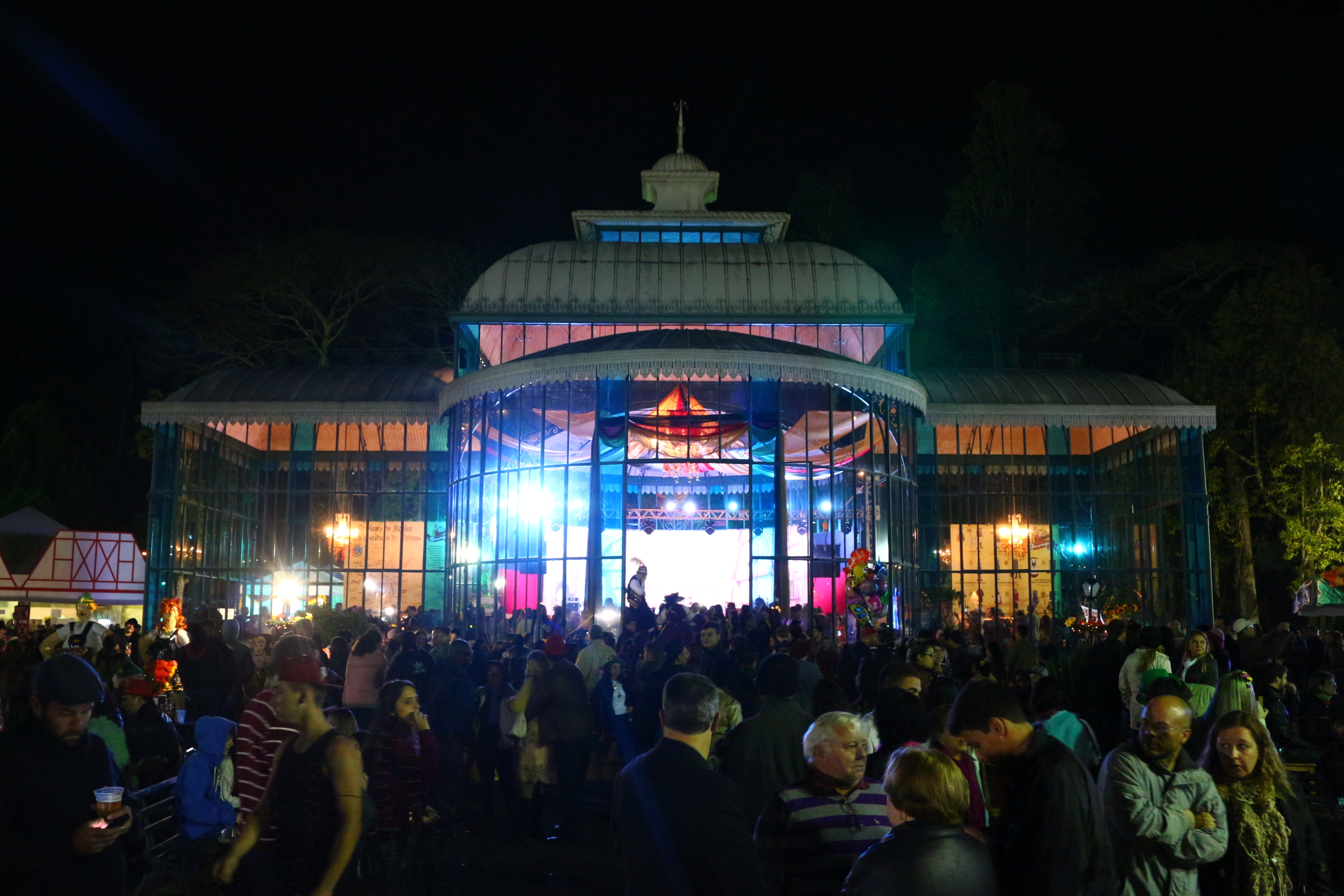
Crystal Palace during the event

The main beverage is beer, desserts and confectionery include chocolate and Black Forest cake. In 2012, there were 368,000 participants who spent R$ 55 million (US$24 million). In 11 days of celebration 7.5 tons of sausage and 35,000 liters of beer were consumed.

== See also ==
- Oktoberfest
