= Mineiro people =

Mineiro People
Povo Mineiro
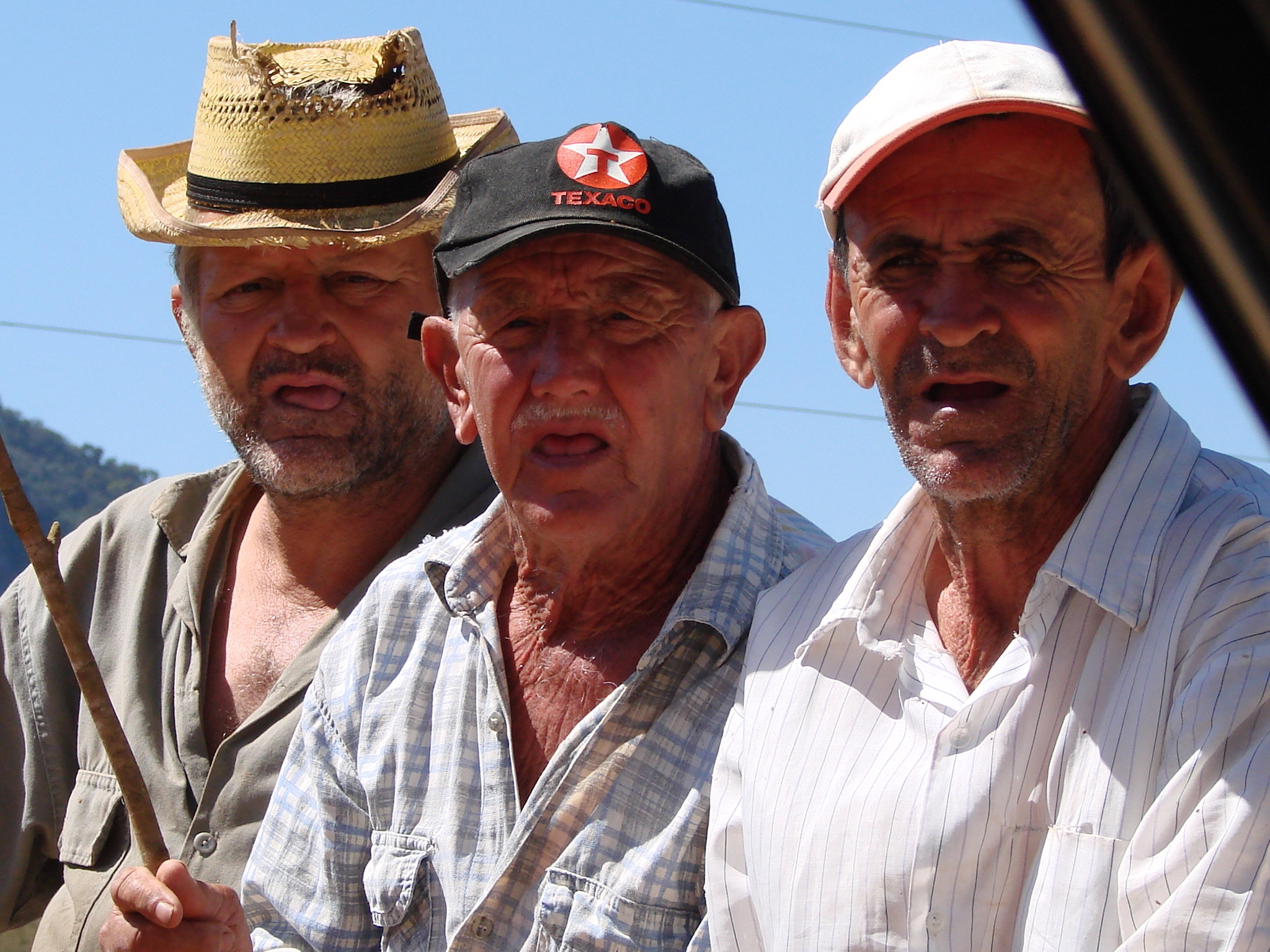
- Mineiro men from Diamantina, Minas Gerais

Total population
- c. 11-12 million (2022)

Languages
- Portuguese, Mineiro dialect

Religion
- Predominantly Roman Catholic

Related ethnic groups
- Sertanejos, Caipiras, Geraizeiro, Portuguese, Bantus, Jê peoples

The Mineiros (Natively: [miˈne(j)ɾu]) are a Brazilian ethnocultural group distributed across the central and eastern parts of the state of Minas Gerais, they are speakers of the Mineiro dialect of Brazilian Portuguese. The origin of the Mineiro culture dates back to the late 17th century, when the discovery of gold in the mountains of Minas Gerais led to mass migration of Portuguese settlers to the region, who also brought enslaved Africans in order to serve as workforce in the mines, forming a new cultural group. The name of the Mineiro people derives from the demonym for people from Minas Gerais.

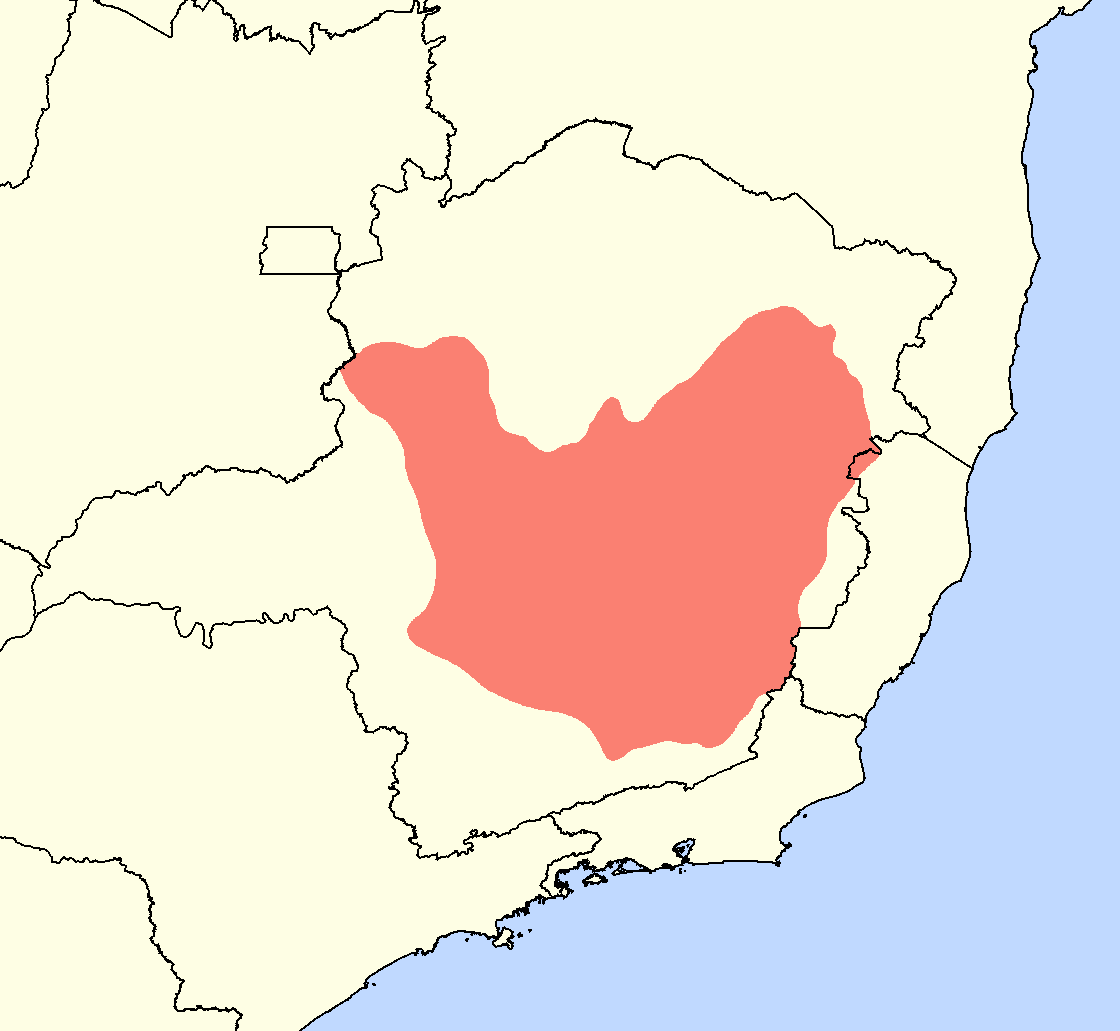
Area inhabited by the Mineiros (red) over a map of southeastern Brazil.

== Culture ==
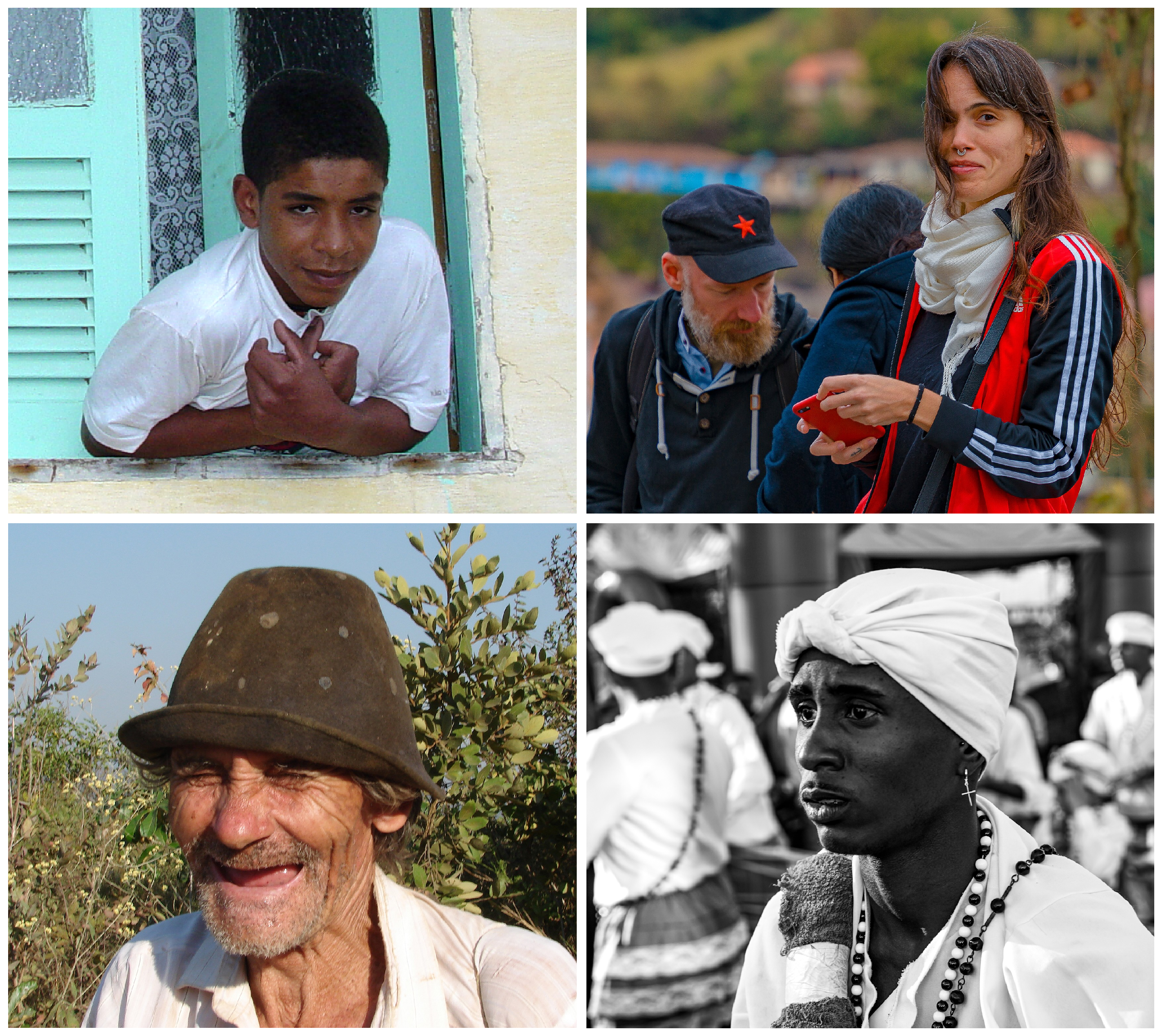
Mineiro people of varied ages and physical appearances.

Mineiro culture is deeply rooted in Catholicism, with the majority of the Mineiros still following the religion to this day, being one of the most catholic areas of the country. In the last decades however, the number of irreligious people and protestants has increased among them, especially in the Belo Horizonte metropolitan zone. Some traditional Mineiro festivities such as Congado and Folia de Reis have elements that were adapted from Afro-Brazilian religions.

Some cultural traditions of the Mineiro people include the Cavalhada, a horse riding festival that originated from the medieval European jousting sport brought by the Portuguese colonizers; Festa do Divino, a Catholic pentecost celebration; Caxambu, a style of dance brought by enslaved Africans from West Africa; and the Mineiro-Pau, a dance based on duels.

Mineiro cuisine includes dishes such as Pão de Queijo (a type of cheesy bread), Feijão Tropeiro, Tutu à Mineira (dish based on beans and cassava flour), Frango com Quiabo (chicken with okra), Vaca Atolada, Torresmo, Minas cheese, Doce de Leite, Romeu e Julieta (cheese with guava paste) and a multitude of cheese varieties.

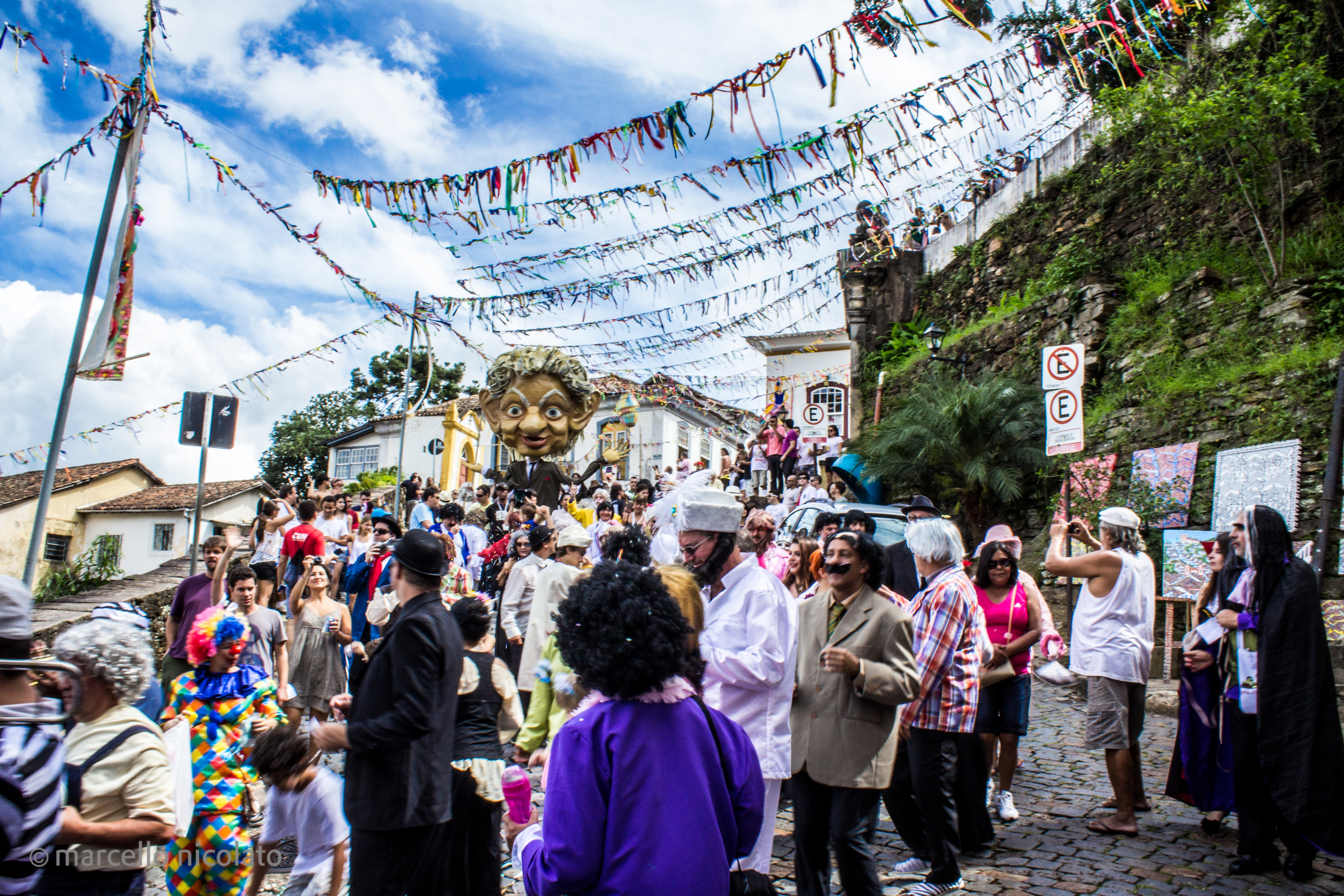
The traditional Ouro Preto carnaval, 2013.

Mineiros are regarded by the other Brazilians as being calm, wary, friendly and welcoming. They are seen as deeply rural and adept of a "small town" lifestyle, and the Mineiro dialect is perceived as sounding funny and slow.

== Genetics ==
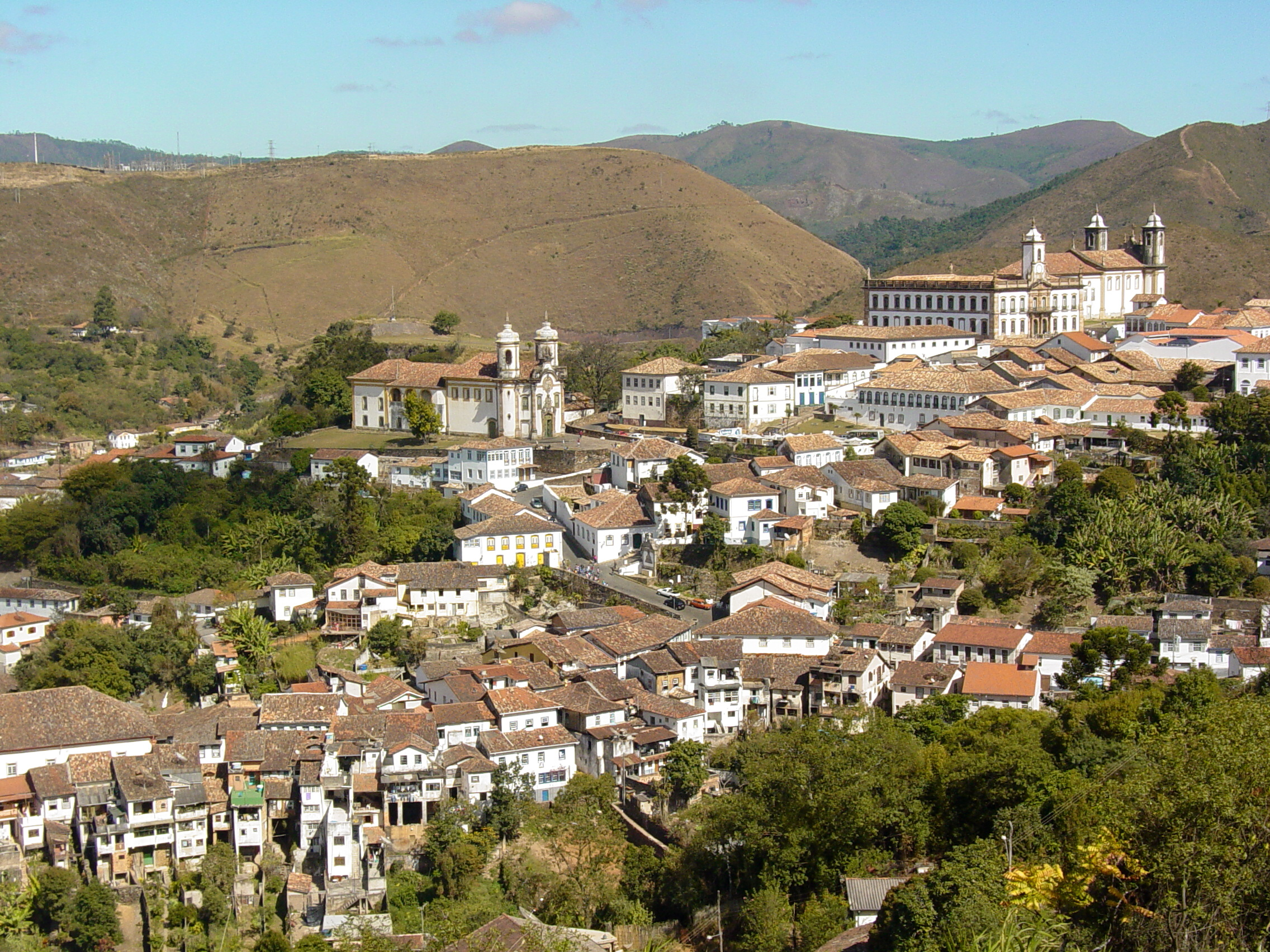
Ouro Preto is the cultural heartland of Minas Gerais. The Mineiro culture originated in the southern side of the Gandarela mountains in the 18th century.

According to the 2022 Brazilian census, 35 to 45% of people in central and eastern Minas Gerais identify as white, 45 to 55% as pardo and 10 to 15% as black. A 2019 genetic study analyzed the autosomal genetic ancestry of Mineiros from Belo Horizonte as being 70% European, 25% African and 5% Amerindian; Mineiros from Manhuaçu as being 73% European, 19% African and 8% Amerindian; those from Ouro Preto as 52% European, 38% African and 10% Amerindian; and the ones from Bambuí as 79% European, 14% African and 7% Amerindian.

== Notable Mineiros ==
- Tancredo Neves - prime minister of Brazil
- Juscelino Kubitschek - 21st president of Brazil (half Roma)
- Dilma Rousseff - 36th president of Brazil
- Santos Dumont - inventor
- Chico Xavier - Philanthropist
- Afonso Pena - 6th president of Brazil
- Aleijadinho - sculptor
- Artur Bernardes - 12th president of Brazil
- Carlos Drummond de Andrade - poet and writer
- Carlos Chagas - scientist
- Ziraldo - cartoonist
- Aécio Neves - politician
- Eike Batista - businessman
- Fred - footballer
- João Guimarães Rosa - novelist
- Levy Fidelix - politician
- Paula Fernandes - singer
