= Vaca atolada =

Brazilian beef dish

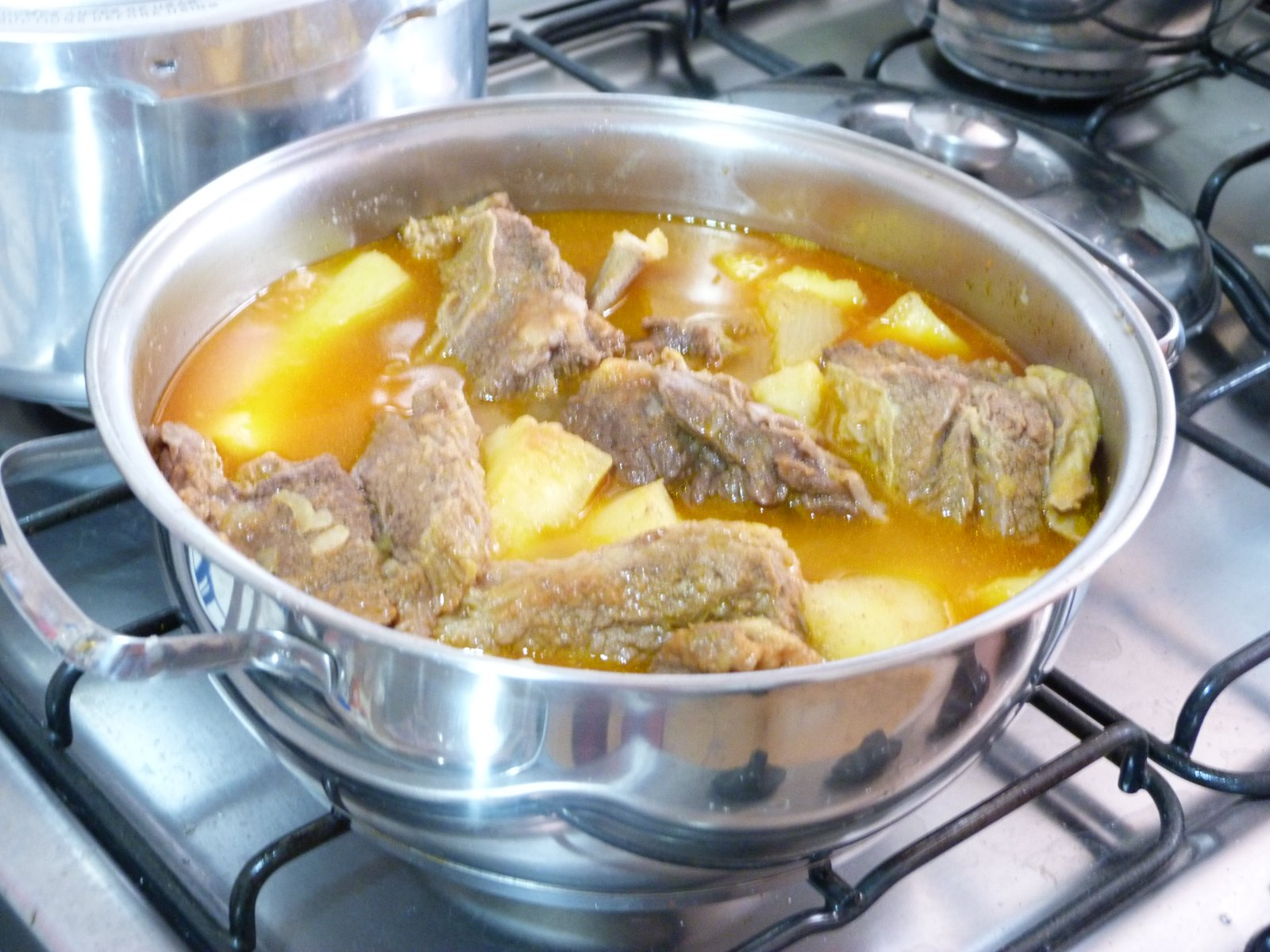
- Vaca atolada being prepared
- Type: Stew
- Place of origin: Brazil
- Serving temperature: Hot
- Main ingredients: rib steak, cassava

Vaca atolada is a Brazilian stew of rib steak and cassava.

The dish originated among pioneers and explorers of the Minas Gerais region who would preserve a mixture of jerky, lard, and cassava as a trail food. While versions made with jerky (carne do sol) do still exist, the dish is now prepared mostly with beef rib.

The dish is now considered typical of Minas Gerais. Variations exist around the coast of Brazil, particularly in Paraná, São Paulo, Rio de Janeiro, Pernambuco, Paraíba, and Piauí.

It is closely related to another dish, cozidão (rib with vegetables), the distinction being that this version is made with other vegetables, such as pumpkin, sweet potato, potato, carrot, or yam.

Some versions, particularly in Rio Grande do Sul, have more explicit Portuguese roots, being made with garlic, onion, tomato, and sometimes bell pepper.
