= German Swiss =

German Swiss usually refers to either a single, a group of, or all Swiss citizens with origins from the German-speaking Switzerland.

German Swiss may also refer to:

- German Swiss International School (Hong Kong)
- German Swiss International School (Ghana)
- German-Swiss border
- Germany–Switzerland relations
- Swiss-German Sign Language

== See also ==
- Swiss-German (disambiguation)
