= Sertanejo people =

Brazilian ethnic group

Povo Sertanejo
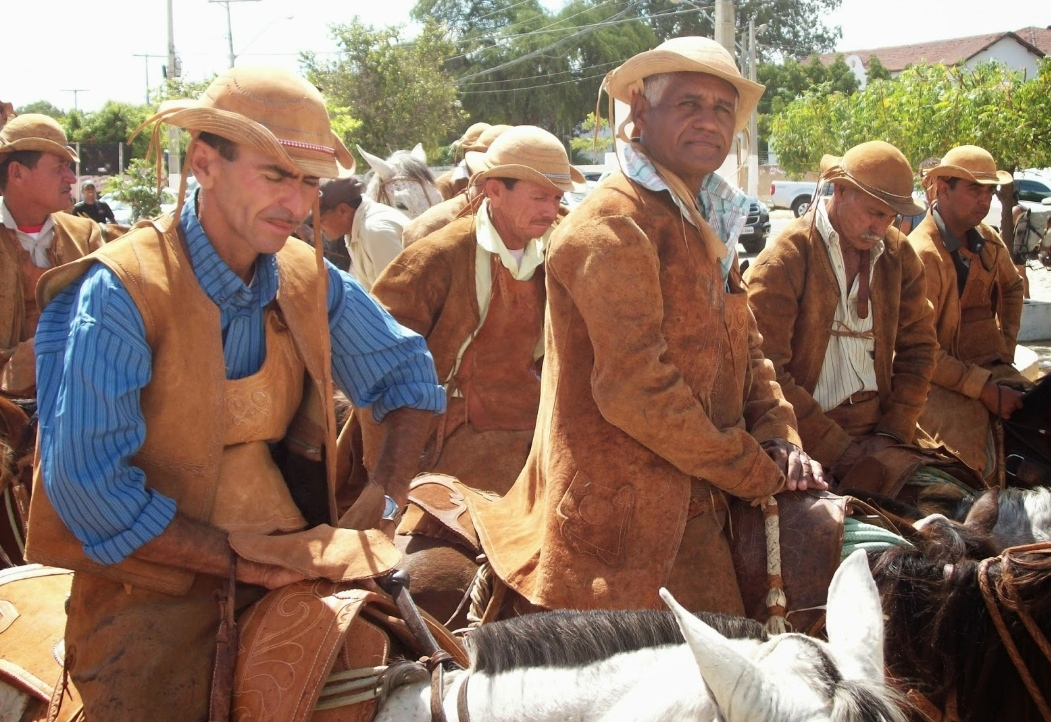
- Sertanejo men participating in a traditional vaquejada, 2022

Total population
- c. 28 million (2022)

Regions with significant populations
- Brazil

Languages
- Portuguese, Central Northeastern dialect and North coast Portuguese

Religion
- Predominantly Roman Catholic

Related ethnic groups
- Portuguese, Galicians, Matutos, Baianos, Maranhenses, Geraizeiros, Sephardic Jews, Jês, Bantus, Yorubas, Berbers

The Sertanejos (natively: [sɛɦtɐ̃ˈneʒu(s)]) are an ethnocultural group distributed across the northeastern Brazilian states of Bahia, Sergipe, Alagoas, Pernambuco, Paraíba, Rio Grande do Norte, Ceará and Piauí, especially in the Sertão and Agreste sub-regions of the Caatinga. Their population is estimated to be roughly 28 million people.

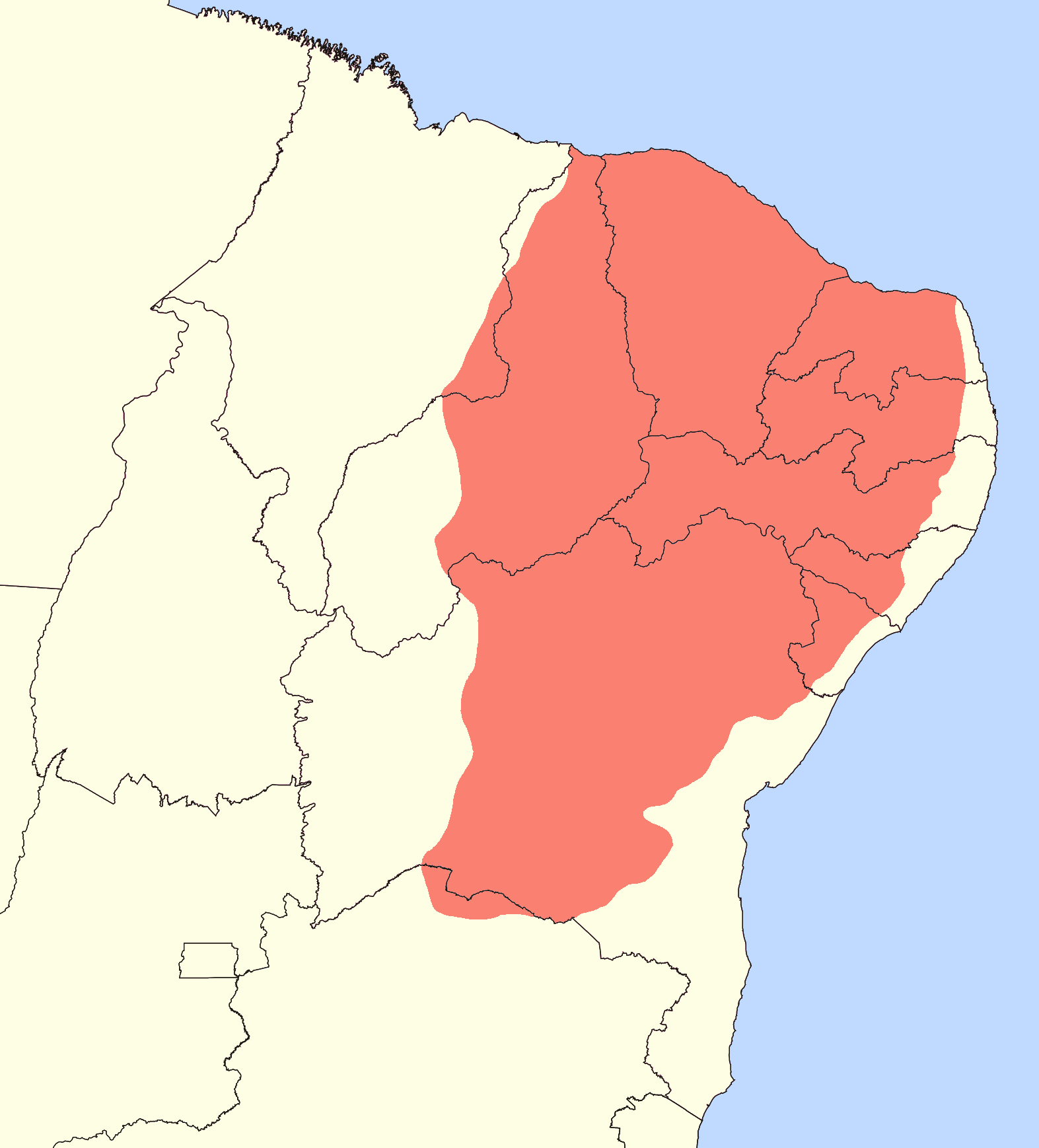
Area inhabited by the Sertanejo people (red) over a map of northeastern Brazil.

The emergence of the Sertanejos dates back to the 16th century in Bahia with the vaqueiros, driven by the advancement of livestock farming towards the interior. The Sertanejo people were formed mainly by the admixture between Portuguese and Jê indigenous peoples, with the participation of mostly free and escaped black people.

== Etymology ==
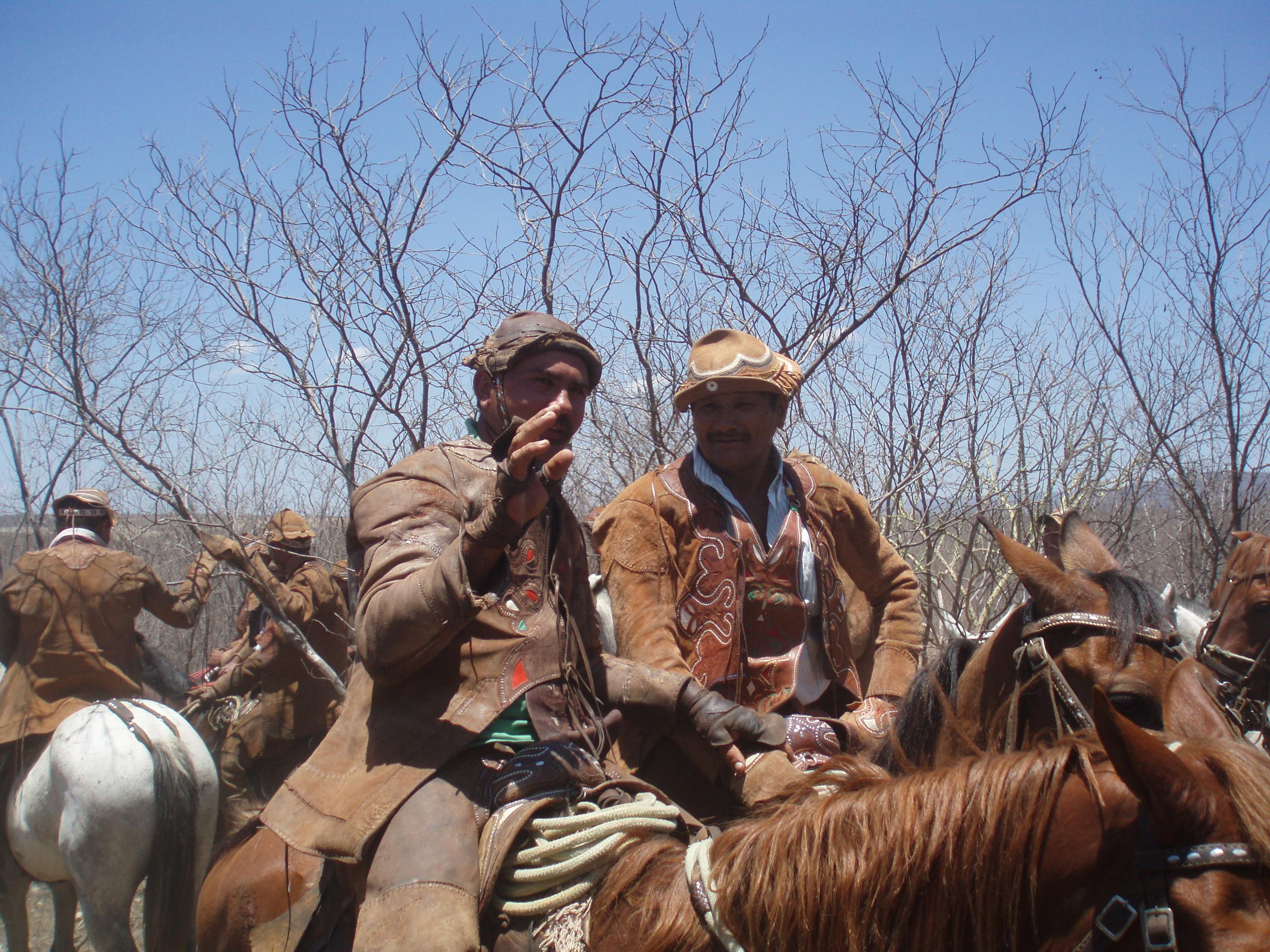
Sertanejo men, 2007.

The term Sertanejo derives from the Portuguese word "sertão", meaning hinterland. During colonial times, sertão was used as a generic term to refer to all territories in the Americas that were not in the coast, as a result, regions of Brazil other than the northeast also adopted the word "sertanejo" to refer to things such as the musical styles and way of speaking of people from the countryside, originating the names for the "sertanejo music" of São Paulo and the "sertanejo dialect" of center-western Brazil, both of which are unrelated to the Sertanejo people. During the 19th and 20th century the use of the term "sertão" as a synonym for all lands considered isolated fell in disuse, as the term became more and more associated specifically with the sertão sub-region of northeastern Brazil.

== History ==
=== Origin ===
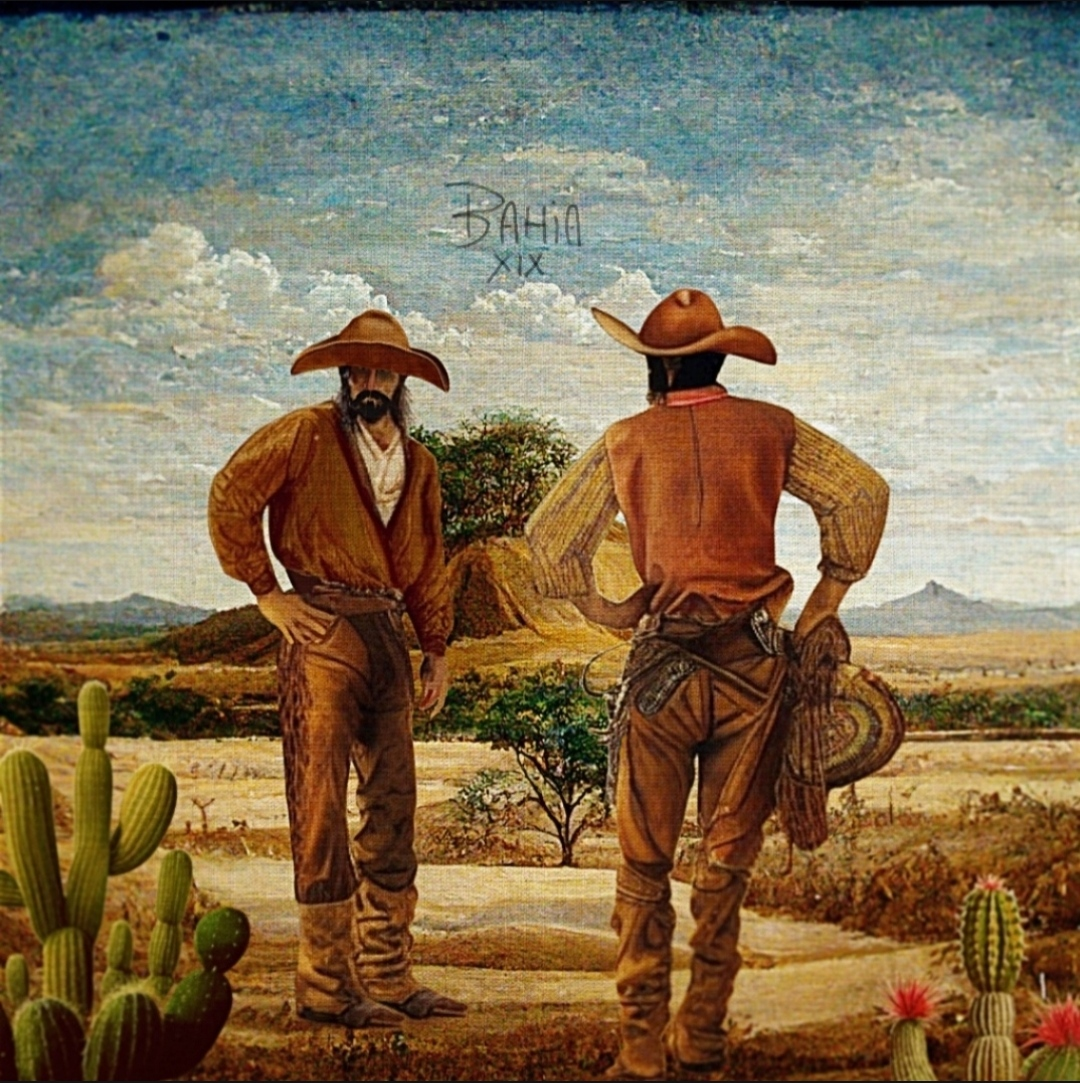
Sertanejos in the caatinga, state of Bahia, engraving from the 1810s.

Cattle were introduced into the Zona da Mata of Northeastern Brazil during the administration of Tomé de Sousa (1549–1553) and were initially directly linked to the sugar cycle, as these animals served as animal traction for the sugarcane fields and as food. Over the decades, the cattle herds multiplied and caused disruption to the sugarcane plantations. This factor, combined with the Dutch invasions of Northeast Brazil, in which many sugar mill pastures were destroyed and many opponents of Dutch rule had to take refuge in the interior, and the social rigidity of the sugar cycle, which required only a few free workers, caused whites, mamelucos, mulattos and blacks from the coastal areas of Bahia and Pernambuco to migrate and establish in the Caatinga, along with the cattle, as vaqueiros (cowboys) and assistants.

The colonization of the semi-arid of Northeastern Brazil occurred between the 16th and 18th centuries and followed the course of its rivers, such as the São Francisco, Parnaíba, Itapicuru, Vaza-Barris, Apodi, Piranhas-Açu, Jaguaribe, Acaraú and Gurgueia, on whose banks many cattle ranches were formed. The vaqueiros and helpers came into conflict with the indigenous people, although there was continuous admixture with the indigenous people in the Caatinga and Amerindians became cowboys.

Originally, there were two large latifundia that dominated the Sertão: Casa da Torre ("House of the Tower"), owned by the Garcia d'Ávila family, and Casa da Ponte ("House of the Bridge"), owned by the Guedes de Brito family. These latifundia were divided into smaller estates, which were rented to the vaqueiros.

=== Expansion into the semiarid ===
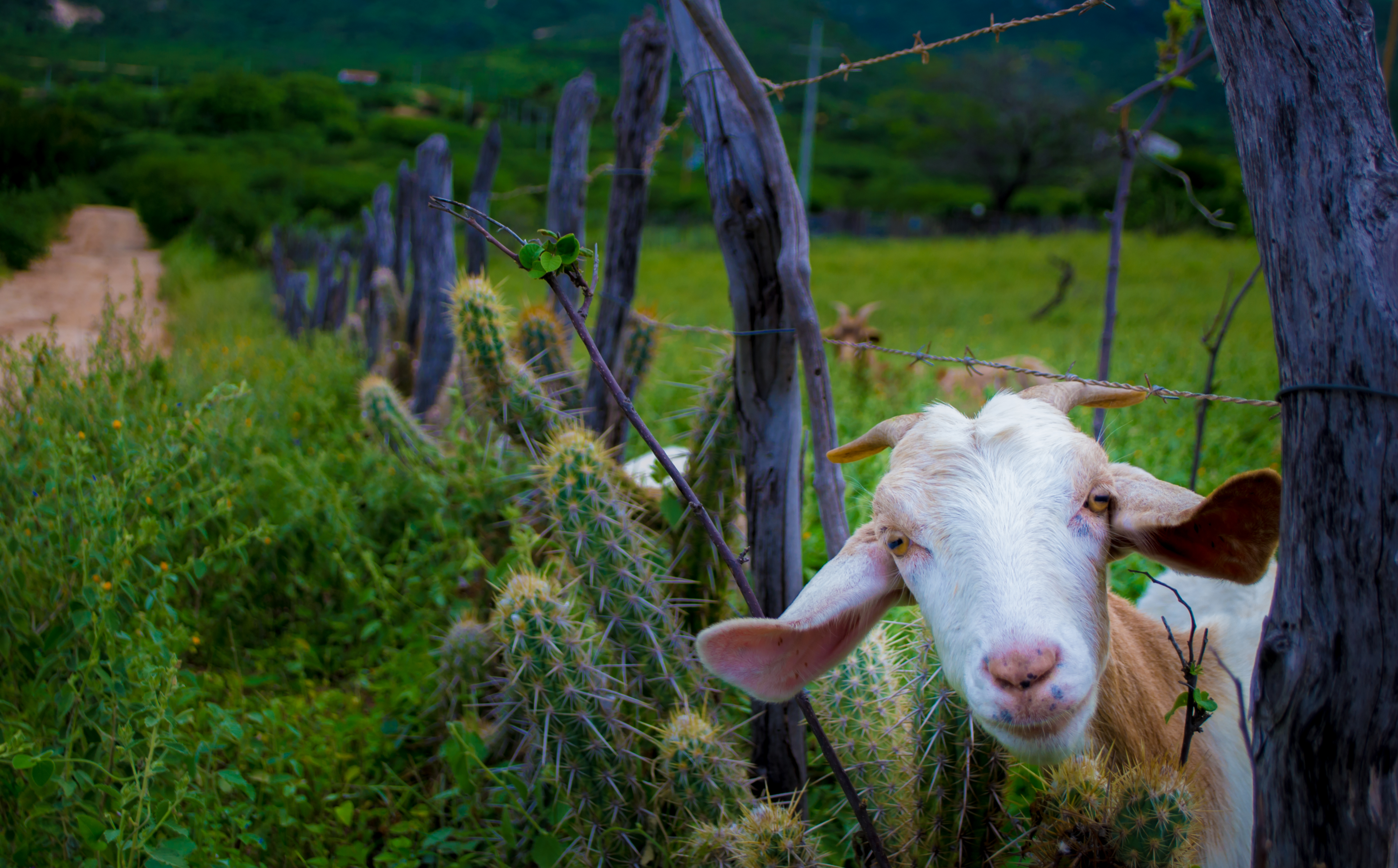
Goats were essential for the settling of the Northeastern sertão. In the image, a goat of the Anglo-Nubian breed in Santana do Seridó, Rio Grande do Norte.

Cattle farming in the Caatinga was an activity that required little labor, which was predominantly free labor, although some regions, such as Piauí, used enslaved African labor on a large scale. The cattle were raised freely and horses were also bred to help the cowboys move around. As the Sertanejos advanced into drier and rockier parts of the Caatinga, the herding of cattle became more difficult due to its water-intensive nature, as a result, animals such as sheep and goats were introduced. Today, the northeast is the leading region in both production and consumption of goat cheese, milk and meat in Brazil.

Life for the Sertanejos was difficult, largely due to the droughts. There was only an abundance of milk and meat, and they used curdled milk and cheese only for their own consumption. As opposed to the more centralized and unequal land distribution of the coast, they owned small plots of land where, during the rainy season, they planted crops such as corn, cassava and beans, a custom adopted from the local Jê-speaking indigenous population, who practiced farming. Cassava flour was mixed with meat to produce paçoca, a typical Sertanejo dish. Various everyday artifacts for the backwoodsmen were made from the cattle's leather, such as huts, canteens, backpacks, beds and clothing.

In the late 17th century the indigenous population of the Cariri micro-region of Ceará began a war of resistance against the encroachment and settlement of Sertanejos in their territory. This war became known as the War of the Barbarians and lasted three decades, eventually, the Portuguese colonial forces managed to defeat the Jês and the war ended in an Amerindian defeat, resuming the process of Sertanejo settlement.

The Bahia's upper backlands and most of Chapada Diamantina, located in the center and center-south of Bahia, had a different historical and social formation from the rest of the Sertão, as they were occupied in the 18th and 19th centuries by the extraction of precious stones, with the massive use of enslaved African labour. Despite this, these Sertanejos of Bahia have a strong rural identity.

The Brazilian anthropologist Darcy Ribeiro compared the Sertanejo cowboys and farmers to the peasants in serfdom of feudal Europe, as both lived their entire lives, from birth, in the region of origin of their parents and grandparents, were tied to land they did not own, and had to pay high taxes to the landowners.

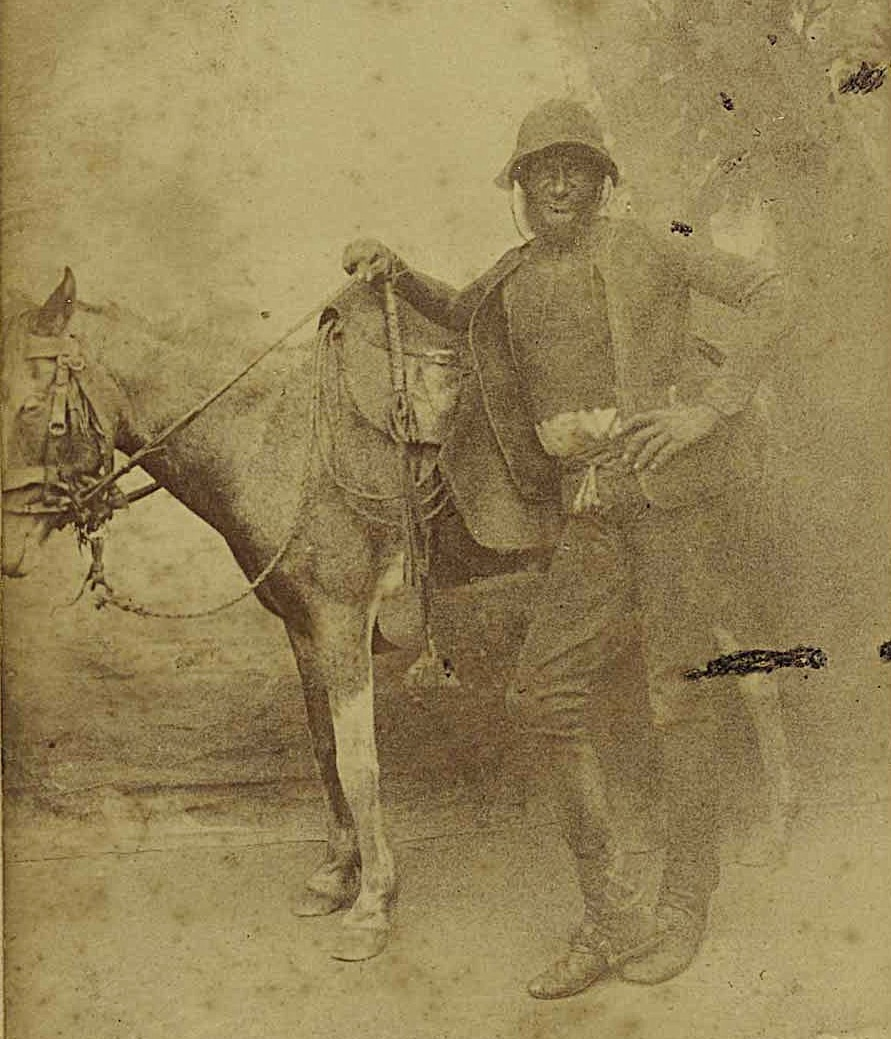
Tipos de Feira de Santana, Bahia - typos do norte 1880 by Thereza Christina Maria.

Contacts between the Sertão and the coast were sporadic and occurred only at certain times of the year, through fairs where cattle ranchers and traders gathered, many of which gave rise to population centers, embryos of current cities such as Feira de Santana (Bahia), Campina Grande (Paraíba), Pastos Bons (Maranhão), Serra Talhada (Pernambuco), and Oeiras (Piauí).

=== Droughts and famine ===
The Brazilian semiarid is prone to drought and irregular rain patterns, especially in the sertão, where the raining season occurs between the months of January and may and depends on the untrustworthy summer thunderstorms. In the agreste, however, the climate is more regular and the raining season occurs during the months of may to august, when cold air fronts coming from the southern atlantic hit the South American continent and form rain clouds, making drought events rarer and less severe.

Due to these characteristics the Sertanejo heartland has suffered many events of famines driven by prolonged events of drought throughout its history, with a total of 84 abnormal incidents of prolonged dry periods occurring since the early 18th century, with possibly many more taking place during the 17th and 16th century, when record keeping by the Portuguese colonial authorities were scarce.

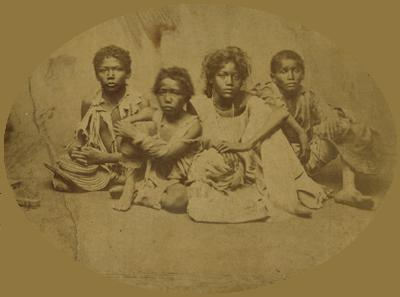
Victims of the Grande Seca, Ceará, 1878.

In the years of 1877 and 1878 the development of the most powerful El Niño event in history led to the Grande Seca, a period of especially severe drought that affected the heartland of the northeastern region of Brazil. The lack of seasonal rain caused the death of herd animals and made the cultivation of seasonal crops impossible, as a result, 400 to 500 thousand sertanejos died, or around 20 to 25% of their total population.

This drought also caused the first event of mass domestic emigration by the sertanejo people, who would become the people with by far the greatest internal diaspora of all Brazilian ethnocultural groups, its estimated that around 200 thousand people emigrated from the sertão and agreste to less drought prone lands in the northeastern coast, amazon and southeastern Brazil. During the 1890s to 1910s a great amount of artificial reservoirs, lakes and ponds were dug across the sertanejo lands, especially in Ceará and Rio Grande do Norte. As a result, the severity of the following droughts was lessened, avoiding a tragedy of the proportions of the Grande Seca.

The edible 'Palma' cactus (Opuntia cochenillifera) was often consumed by Sertanejos as a famine food during droughts, either by itself or heavily seasoned with salt and vinegar, as their strong taste would water down the "grassy" taste of the cactus. Palma was prepared by carefully removing the outer layer in order to get rid of spikes and then boiled in water to make it safe for consumption. Today Palma is still cultivated by Sertanejos during dry season but human consumption is quite rare, being used to feed cattle and goats instead. Interestingly, the plant is not native to Brazil, but was introduced to the region from Mexico in the 19th century.

=== War and government oppression ===
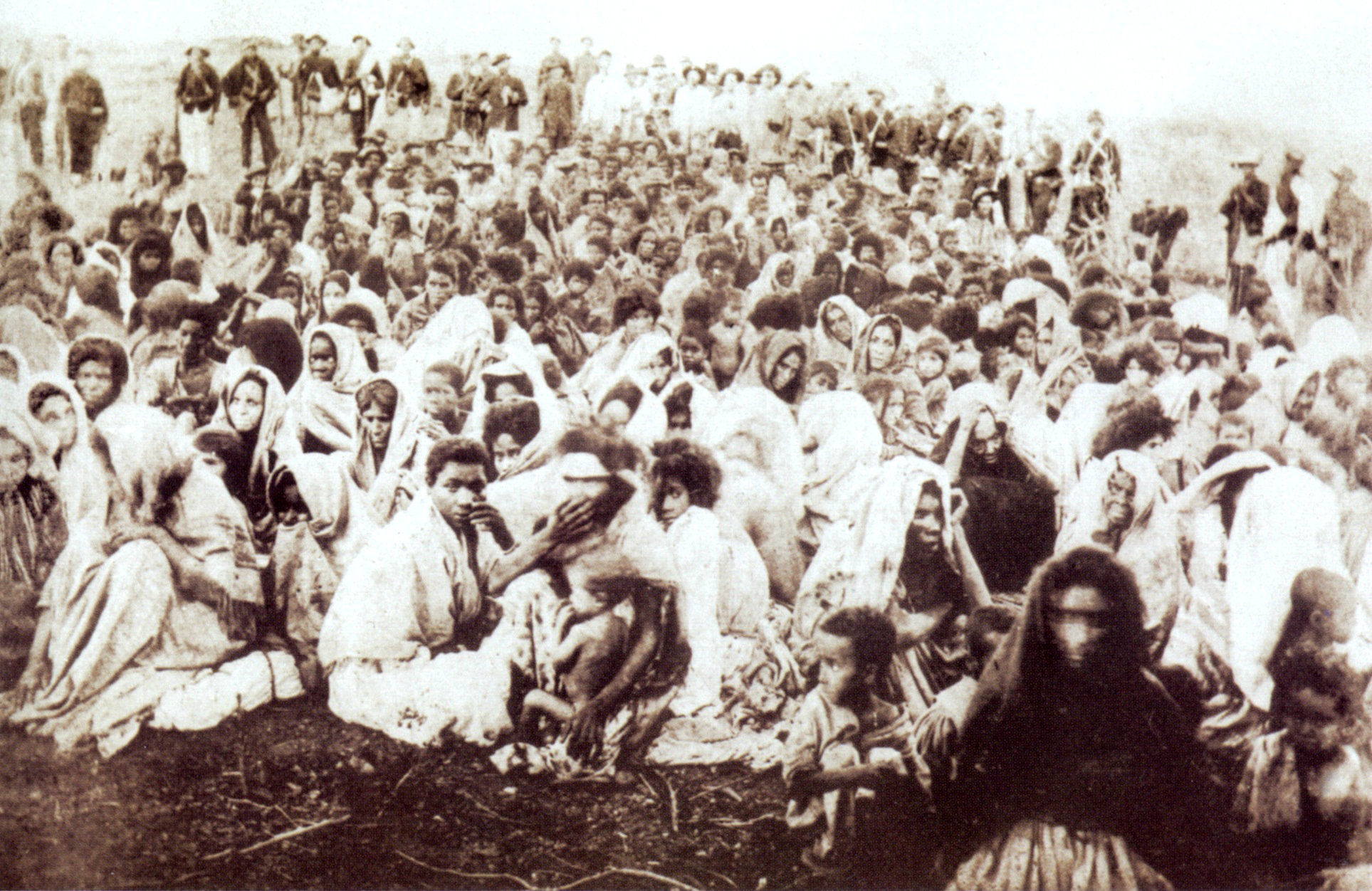
The few survivors of the Canudos massacre, 1897.

During the late 19th and early 20th century the federal government of Brazil, sometimes with support of local oligarchs and political figures, led multiple massacres against lower class Sertanejos in the states of Bahia, Pernambuco, Ceará. The largest and most famous of those massacres occurred during the War of Canudos, when peasants in the sertão of Bahia led by Catholic preacher Antônio Conselheiro built a communal and classless settlement of 30 thousand inhabitants in the middle of the semiarid, named "Belo Monte". Local landowners and government officials feared the influence this would have in the region and pressured the federal government to take military action against the peasants, claiming the locals were supporters of monarchism and planned to topple the recently established Brazilian First Republic. Between 1896 and 1897 the town was sieged by the Brazilian military in four different expeditions, resulting in the death of 20 thousand civilians. Other massacres against Sertanejos in the period include Pau de Colher and the Caldeirão de Santa Cruz do Deserto.

=== Cangaço ===
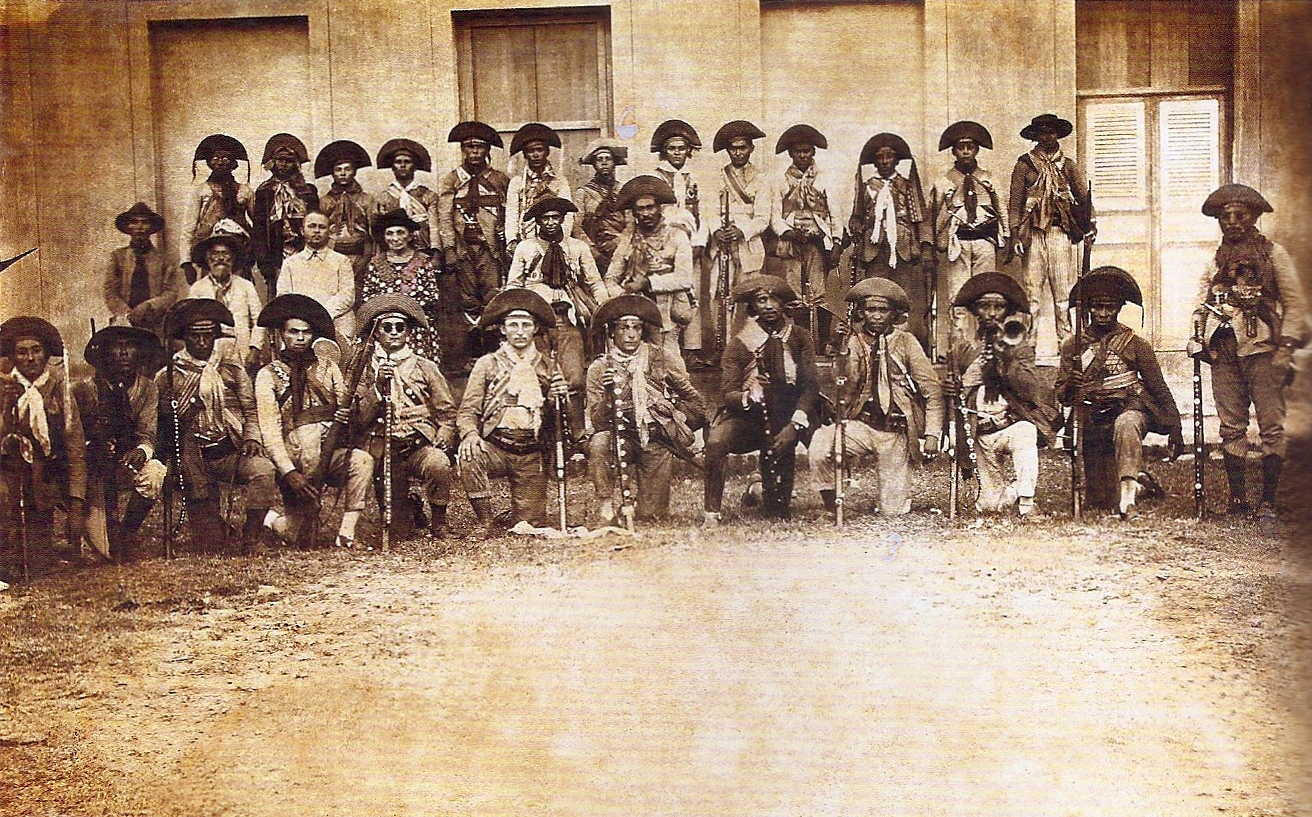
Lampião and his group in Limoeiro do Norte, 1927.

Social unrest, general poverty and the introduction via importation of cheaper and easily purchasable rifles, pistols and ammunition from the United States and United Kingdom in the 19th century caused the Sertanejo heartland to become plagued by banditry and crime between the 1840s and 1930s, peaking in the 1920s. This phenomenon became known as the cangaço, and the perpetrators as cangaceiros. Cangaceiro groups would generally form from the creation of family bands, often starting due to feuds between families and cycles of revenge. People who took part in murders would become fugitives of the law, driving them to leave their home town and villages to avoid arrest and instead adopting a nomadic lifestyle, often robbing farms and livestock to sustain themselves. Eventually, other people from different families and places that were also trying to escape justice persecution would join other bands, forming major groups that could number dozens to hundreds of people, which made crackdown by the local police forces difficult. Powerful landowners and colonels would often hire these bands to protect their lands or impose power over the local population or political opponents.

Before the Vargas government, Brazilian police worked independently in each state of the country, being unable to freely move into a neighboring state without permission from the local government. The small size and horizontal-shaped territories of northeastern Brazilian states made this legal technicality easily exploitable by the cangaceiros, who could go from one state to another in the same day riding on horseback, making police chase hard. In the 1930s changes in the law, intervention by the federal government and use of the army and other military forces instead of police brought the cangaço to its end, with the most famous and powerful cangaceiro band led by Lampião being killed during an ambush in Poço Redondo, Sergipe, in the year of 1938. Other major cangaceiros include Antônio Silvino, Zé Baiano, Corisco, Maria Bonita, Adolfo Meia-Noite, Sinhô Pereira and Anésia Cauaçu.

=== Recent history ===
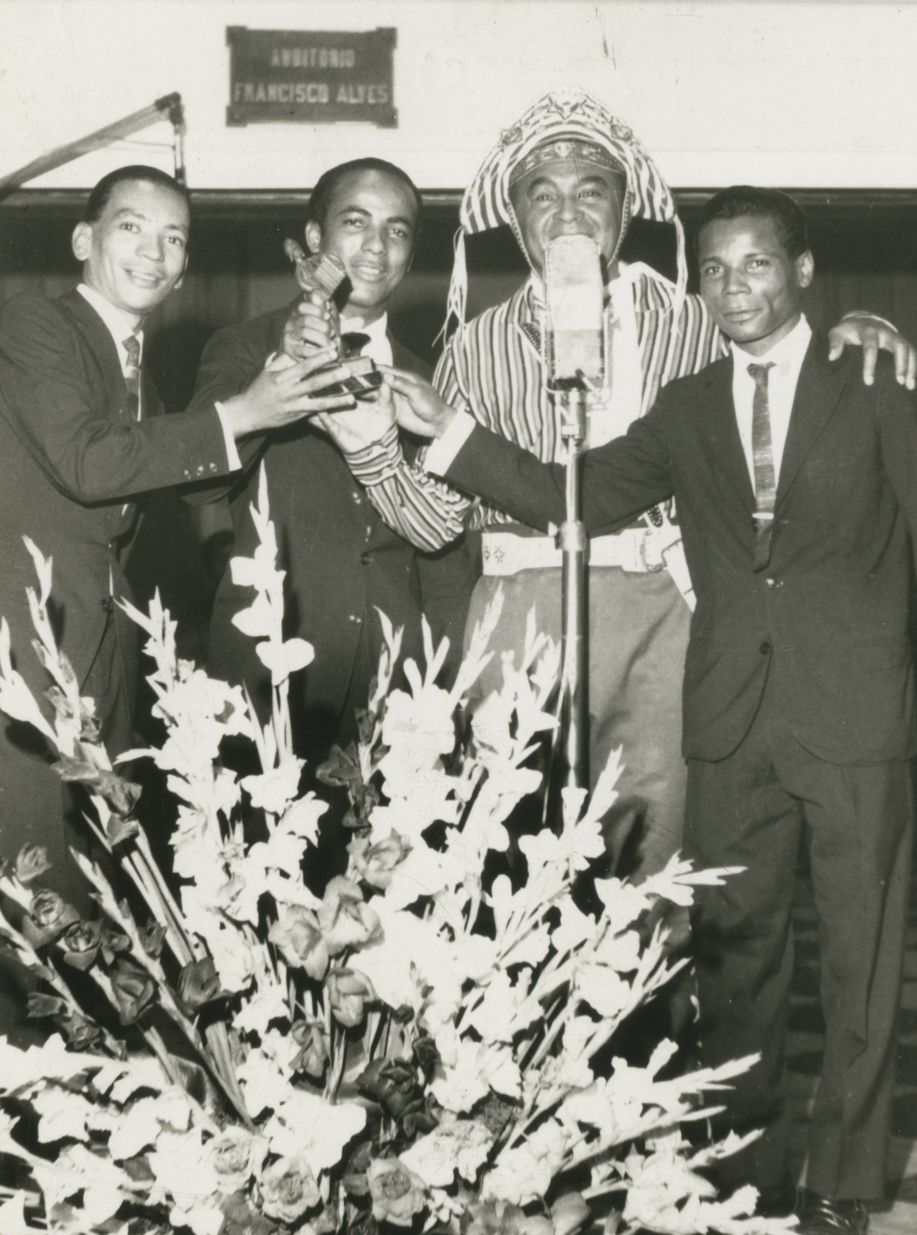
(From left to right) Musicians Lindu, Coroné, Luiz Gonzaga and Cobrinha, some of the most famous forró singers in Brazil. All of whom were Sertanejos who moved to the southeast and found success in music.

Between the 1950s and 1980s, economic stagnation, unemployment, lack of land availability and social unrest drove millions of Sertanejos to emigrate from their homeland to the south and southeast of Brazil in search of job opportunities and a better life, specially in the states of São Paulo and Rio de Janeiro. The majority of these immigrants found jobs in areas such as construction, agriculture and industry, helping with the erection of buildings, roads and bridges.

Due to the assimilatory nature of most Brazilian cultures, same religion and same language, the vast majority of descendants of Sertanejos in these regions were assimilated and adopted the local cultures, dialects and customs. Its extremely difficult to estimate how many people that live outside of northeastern Brazil today are descended from those immigrants, but as of 2022, 10 million people born in the northeast reside in states outside of the region, of which most come from the semiarid.

=== Discrimination ===
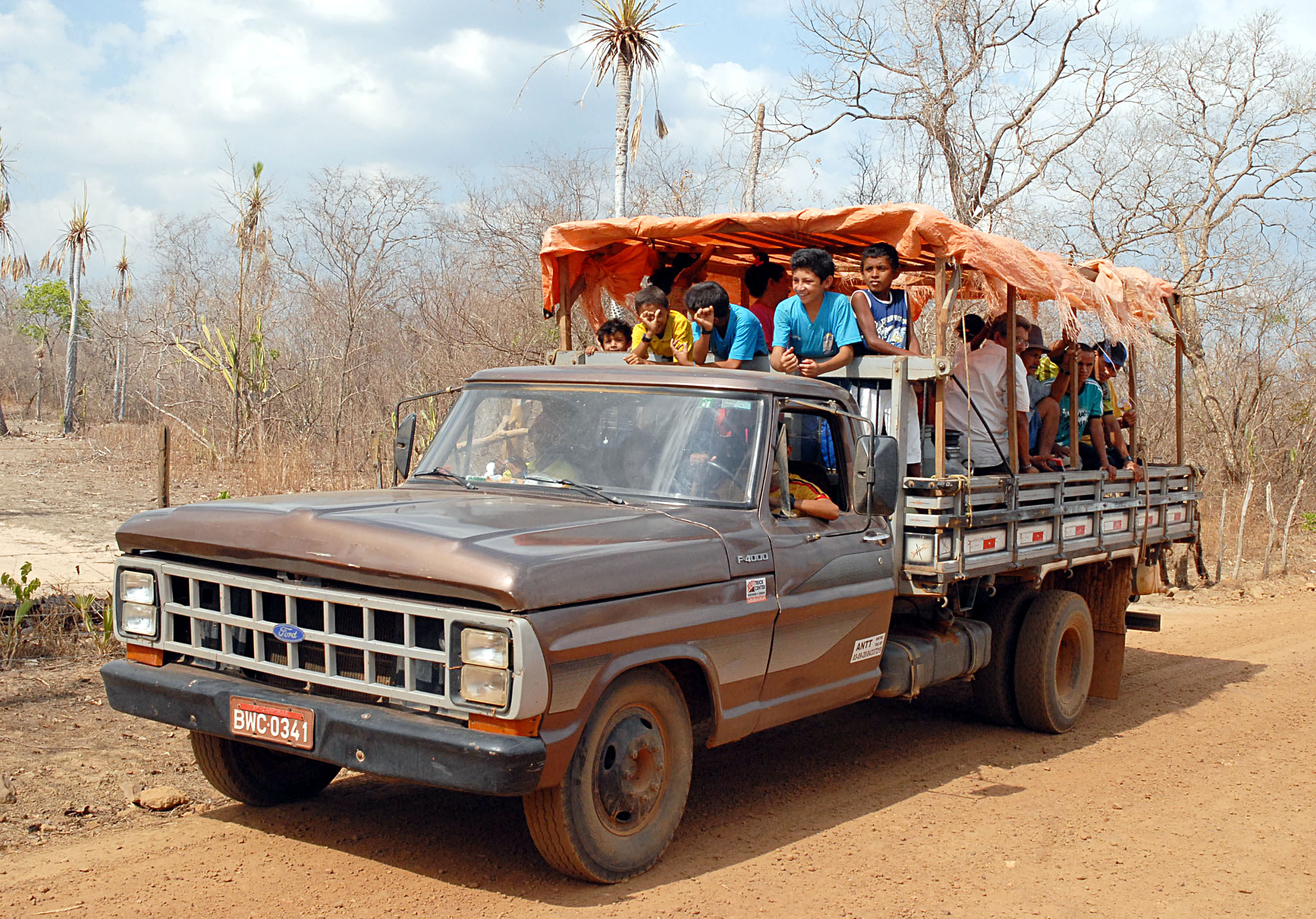
'Pau de Arara' truck used for mass transportation of Sertanejo immigrants to the southeast of Brazil during the exodus of the mid and late 20th century. Caraúbas do Piauí, 2006.

Sertanejos are a discriminated cultural minority in Brazil, historically suffering from acts of xenophobia and prejudicial treatment, mainly in the Southeast and South of the country. Sertanejos and other Northeastern peoples are sometimes referred to with the use of offensive terms, such as 'Paraíba' (generalization of origin based on the state of Paraíba), 'Baiano' (generalization of origin based on the state of Bahia), 'cabeça chata' (lit. 'flat head'), 'pau de arara' (referring to the pau-de-arara trucks which immigrants from the northeast arrived in), 'cabeçudo' (lit. 'large head') and 'mulher macho' (lit. 'male woman').

Discrimination against Sertanejos and other northeasterners in Brazil is especially prevalent during federal elections, as people from the region have voted mostly in favour of the Worker's Party's candidates in presidential elections since the year of 2002, a political shift led by the positive economic trends that took place in northeastern Brazil during the 2000s under the government of Lula da Silva, himself a Sertanejo. In 2023 the Brazilian Superior Court of Justice equated acts of discrimination against northeasterners to the crime of racism, present in the article number 20 of the law 7.716/1989 of the 1988 Brazilian constitution.

== Demographics ==
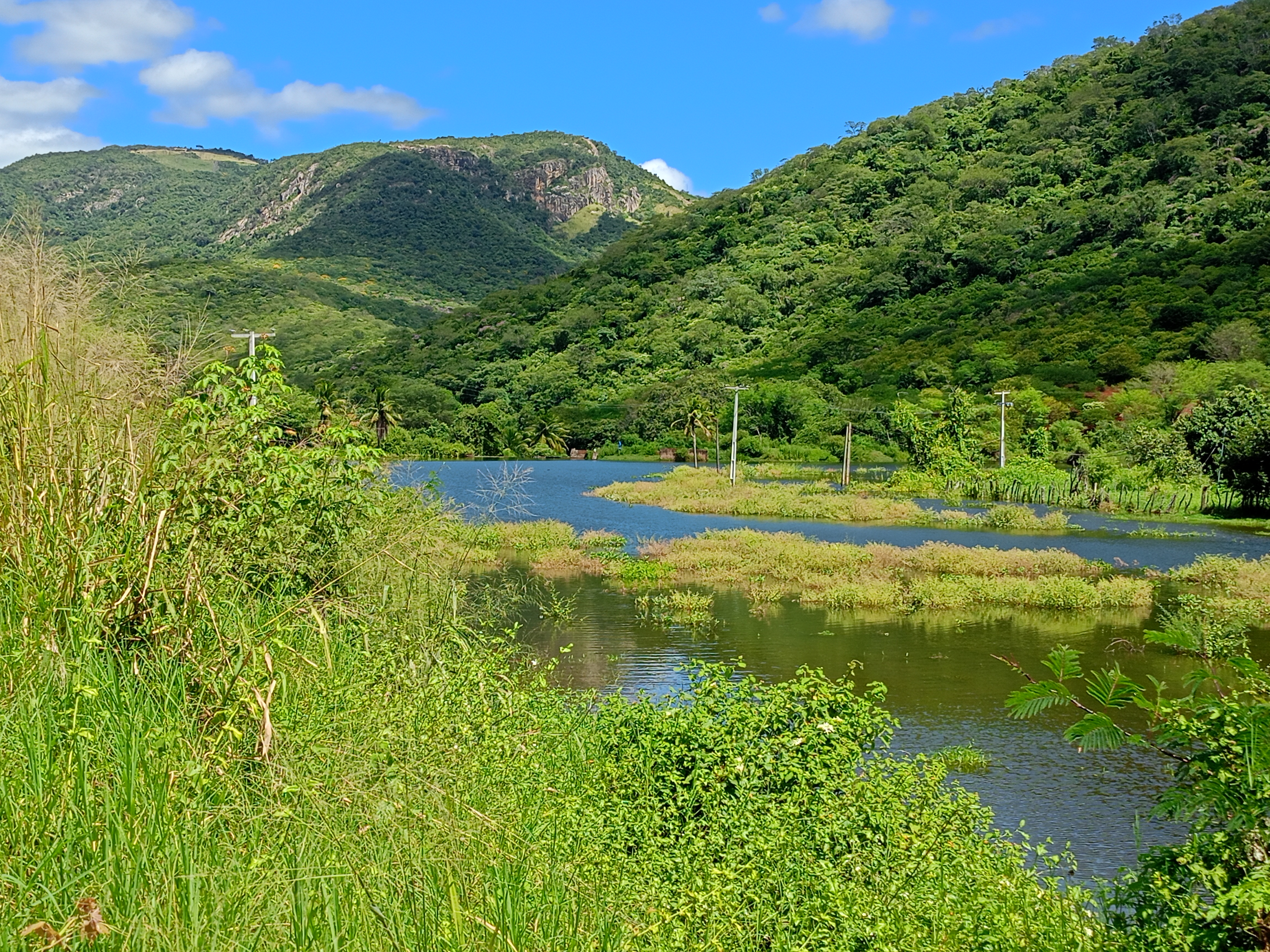
Forested area in the municipality of Flores, in the sertão of Pernambuco. Despite the semiarid climate, the Sertanejo heartland receives enough rainfall to sustain a decently sized population.

Sertanejos have lived in their current range since at least the early 1700s, as this is when several of the cities that sit in the western and southern frontier of their territory and were founded by Sertanejos date their earliest mentions to, with Oeiras being founded in 1717, Caetité in 1724, Xique-Xique in 1714 and Bom Jesus da Lapa in 1691. Later expansion into the Cerrado of Tocantins and the far western Bahia highlands took place in the 19th and 20th century, but these areas remain as mosaic of Caipira, Sertanejo, Maranhense and Caboclo immigrants and transplants rather than solidly being part of any cultural zone. Since the territory inhabited by the Sertanejo people is geographically well-defined by the semiarid climate and the Caatinga biome, it is possible to calculate population estimates for the Sertanejo people as far back as 1872, when the first Brazilian census was conducted, as it collected population data down to municipality level.

The numbers in the table beneath do not include Sertanejos born in the Caatinga that moved into other parts of the country, as reliable internal immigration data in Brazil was not available until the most recent censuses. Based on the 2022 census it can be estimated that around 6 million Sertanejos live outside of Northeastern Brazil, with a few million more living in the culturally Matuto and Baiano coastal metropolises of the Northeast, as they offer more job opportunities. As such, the total population of Sertanejo people, including the ones that stayed in the heartland and the first generation immigrants, could be as high as 36-40 million people, with an uncalculable number of second and third generation descendants.

Year	Estimated population	Yearly Growth	Percentage of total Brazilian population
2022	28,000,000	+0.3%	13.7%
2010	27,000,000	+0.8%	14.1%
2000	25,000,000	+1.5%	14.7%
1991	22,000,000	+1.4%	14.9%
1980	19,000,000	+1.1%	15.9%
1970	17,000,000	+4.1%	18.2%
1960	12,000,000	+2.0%	17.1%
1950	10,000,000	+3.8%	19.2%
1940	7,200,000	+1.5%	17.4%
1920	5,500,000	+2.2%	17.9%
1900	3,800,000	+4.0%	21.8%
1890	2,700,000	+1.9%	18.8%
1872	2,000,000		20.2%

Technological improvements in medicine and agriculture led to a decrease in infant mortality and an increase in agricultural output in the early 20th century, which caused a population boom among Sertanejos. The percentage of children that died before reaching the age of 1 fell from 18% in the early 1900s to 13% in 1980 and 1.4% in 2024, much as a result of efforts in vaccination and the introduction of basic universal free healthcare to the rural areas of the Northeastern sertão in the 1990s.

Population growth began to slow down in the beginning of the 21st due to a decrease in fertility rates driven by societal changes and an increase in women education rates. Total fertility rate in the Sertanejo heartland sat around the mark of 8 children per women until the 1950s, starting to fall sharply from the 1980s onwards and going below the replacement rate of 2.1 by 2010, as of 2024 the TFR was 1.6 children per woman.

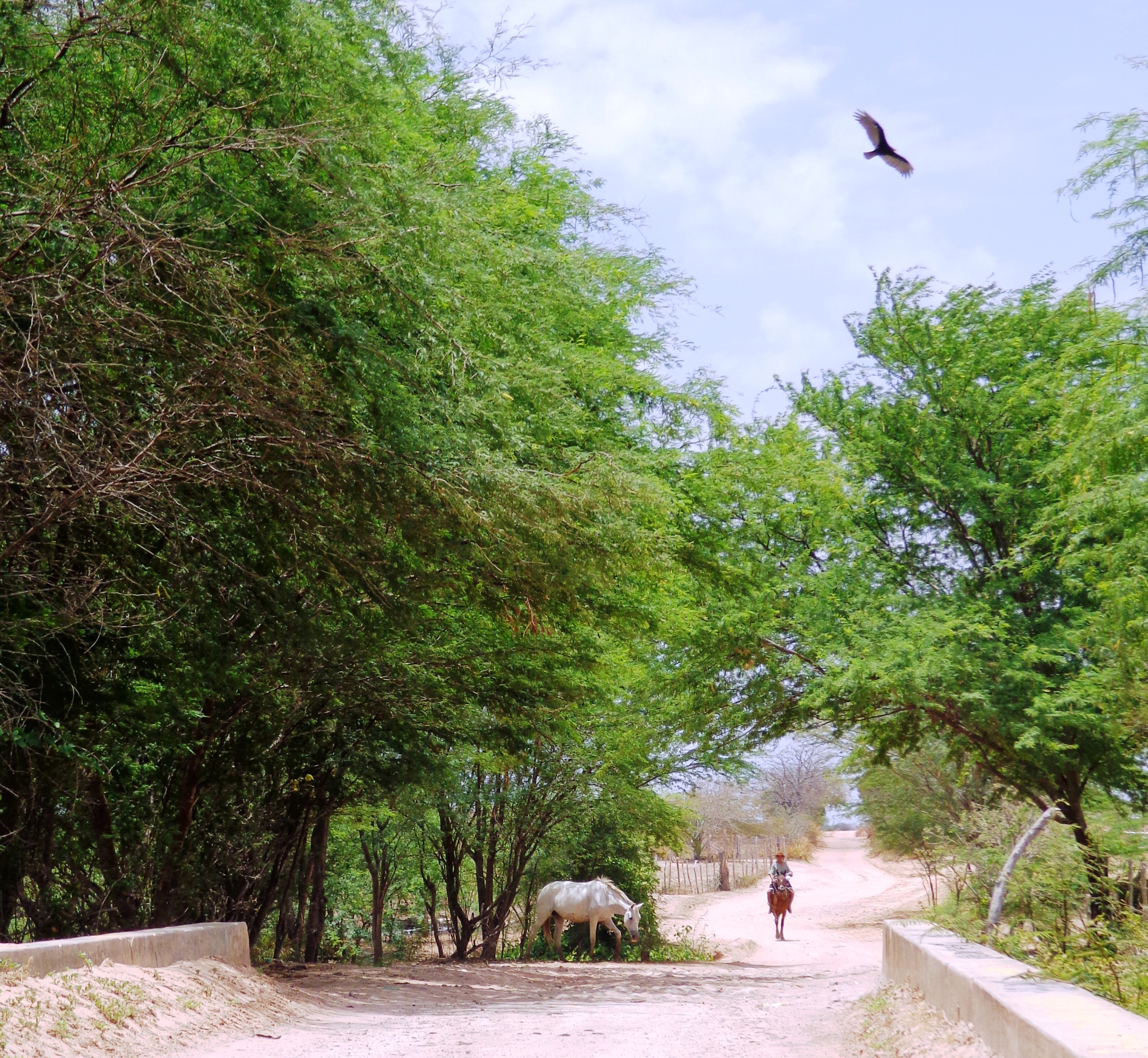
Road in the rural zone of Nossa Senhora da Glória, Sergipe.

The Brazilian sertão and agreste are very rural, most Sertanejos live in small towns with populations that range from 5000 to 50000 people. According to the Brazilian census the rural population in the area is of around 30 to 32%, higher than the national average of 12.6%. The IBGE defines "rural" as anything that is not part of the main settlement of a municipality, therefore including villages, hamlets and isolated households.

== Dialect ==
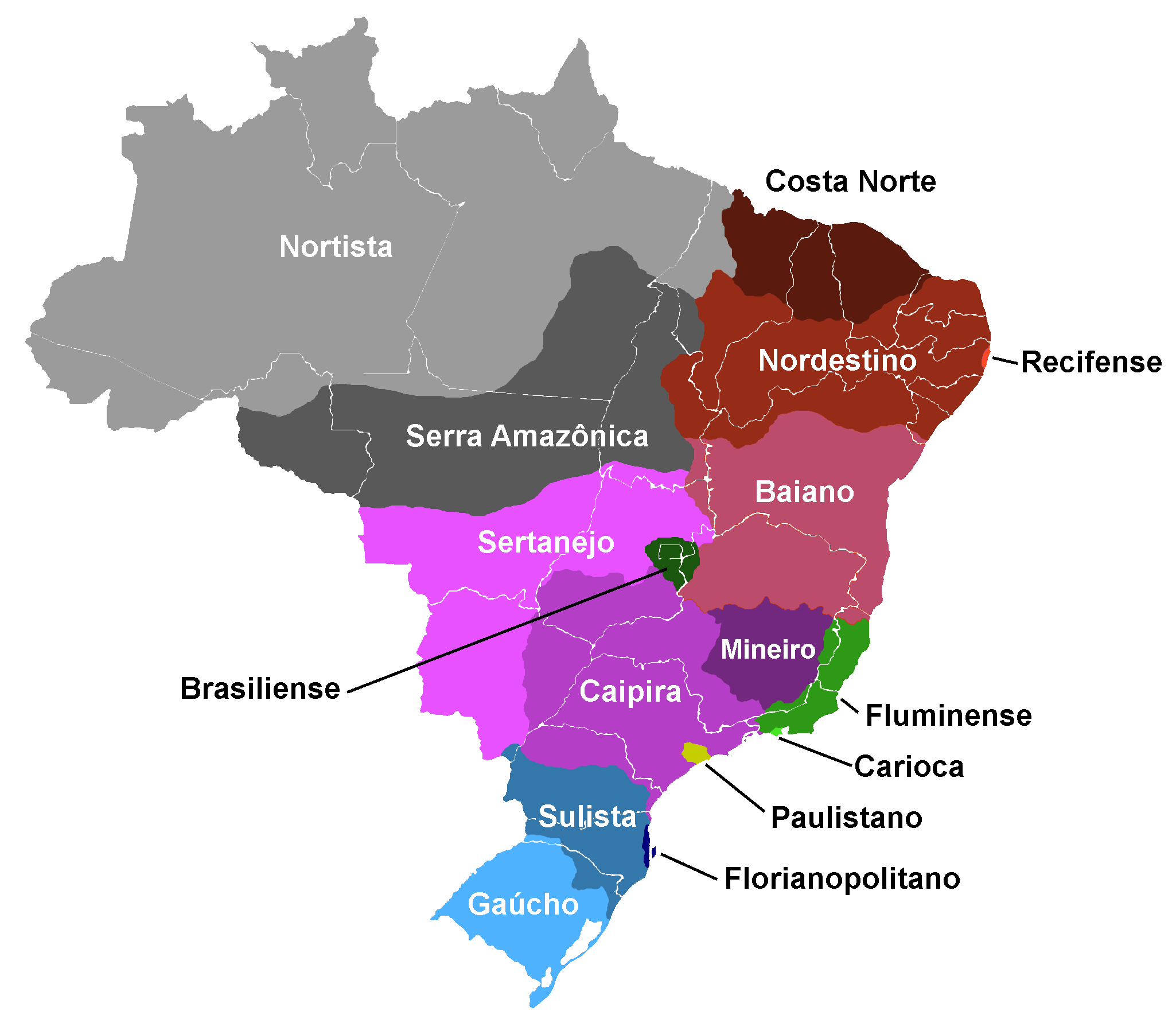
Map of Brazilian Portuguese dialects.

Most Sertanejos are speakers of the Central Northeastern Portuguese dialect, with the remainder being speakers of Costa Norte and Baiano. It is often perceived as a "harsh", "uneducated", "rude" and "manly" way of speaking by people from other regions of the country who did not grow up around its speakers.

The Northeastern dialects are easily recognizable and often the target of discrimination by other Brazilians due to the perceived difficulty in understanding speakers of rural variants and the xenophobic stereotypes associated with northeasterners in the southeast of Brazil. Despite this, the way of speaking of the Sertanejos has found its way in poetry, music, comedy and other artistic fields, being one of the main cultural and self-identification aspects of the people.

Sertanejo people traditionally refer to their parents and grandparents with the hierarchical formal titles of Senhor and Senhora (mr. and ms.), although this is less common nowadays. Sertanejos consider referring to parents and other older family members by their personal names as disrespectful.

Sertanejos make use reverse addressing, a linguistic phenomenon where a parent or grandparent makes use of their own kinship title to address a younger relative; for example, a mother calling their child "mom" or "dad".

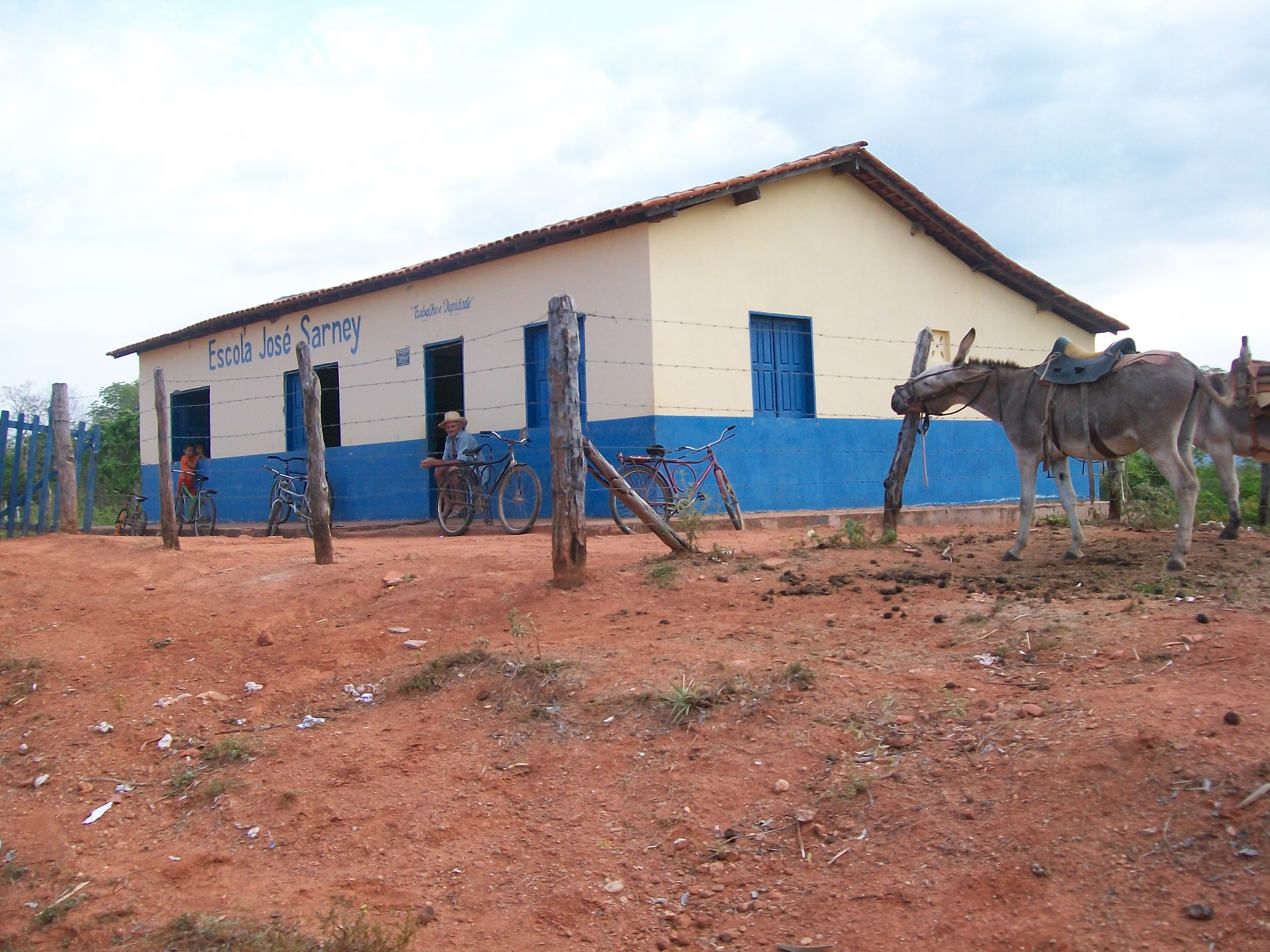
Rural school in Loreto, Maranhão.

Some discernible characteristics of the Central Northeastern dialect include:

- Transformation of the /ɲ/ sound into /ĩj̃/. (e.g.: /sẽˈɲɔɾɐ/ becomes /sĩˈj̃ɔɾɐ/)
- Aversion of the /ʎ/ sound. (e.g.: /miʎu/ becomes /miw/, /piˈoʎu/ becomes /piˈoju/)
- Elimination of /ɾ/ and /s/ sounds in the end of words. (e.g.: /pɛˈgɐɾ/ becomes /pɛˈga/)
- Use of "tu" instead of "você" (you).
- Transformation of the "ndo" of verbs in the gerund into "no". (e.g.: /ˈvẽdu/ becomes /ˈvẽnu/)
- Transformation of the /v/ sound into /h/ or /ɦ/. (e.g.: /ˈvɐ̃mus/ becomes /ˈhɐ̃mu/)
- Elimination of /ɾ/ when followed by a vowel and preceded by a consonant. (e.g.: /ˈk͡watɾu/ becomes /ˈk͡watu/)
- Transformation the "rem" ending of verbs in the subjunctive future into "ri". (e.g.: /pɛˈgɐɾẽj/ becomes /pɛˈgɐɾi/)
- Palatalization of the letter T when it comes in the last syllable of some words, but with different rules to the palatalizations that occur in other Brazilian dialects. (e.g.: /diˈɾejtu/ becomes /diˈɾet͡ʃu/)
- Plural articles become connected to the beginning of the next word. (e.g.: /ˈnɐs oˈɾeʎɐs/ becomes /nɐzuˈɾeɐ)
- Shortening of vowels, mainly in the end of words, although not to the same degree as the European Portuguese dialects.
- Transformation of the /s/ sound into /ʃ/ when it comes before the letters T and D. (e.g.: /ˈpɛsti/ becomes /ˈpɛʃti/)
- Elimination of the /w/ sound in the end of some words. (e.g.: /ˈsɔw/ becomes /ˈsɔ/)
- Elimination of the /j/ sound when it comes after a vowel. (e.g.: /ˈkejʒu/ becomes /ˈkeʒu/)
- Faster talking speed.
- Lack of most palatalizations of D and T in the positions where they are present in other Brazilian dialects. (e.g.: /ˈdẽt͡ʃi/ becomes /ˈdẽti/)
- Occurrence of vowel harmonization. (e.g.: /peˈgɐɾ/ becomes /pɛˈga/)

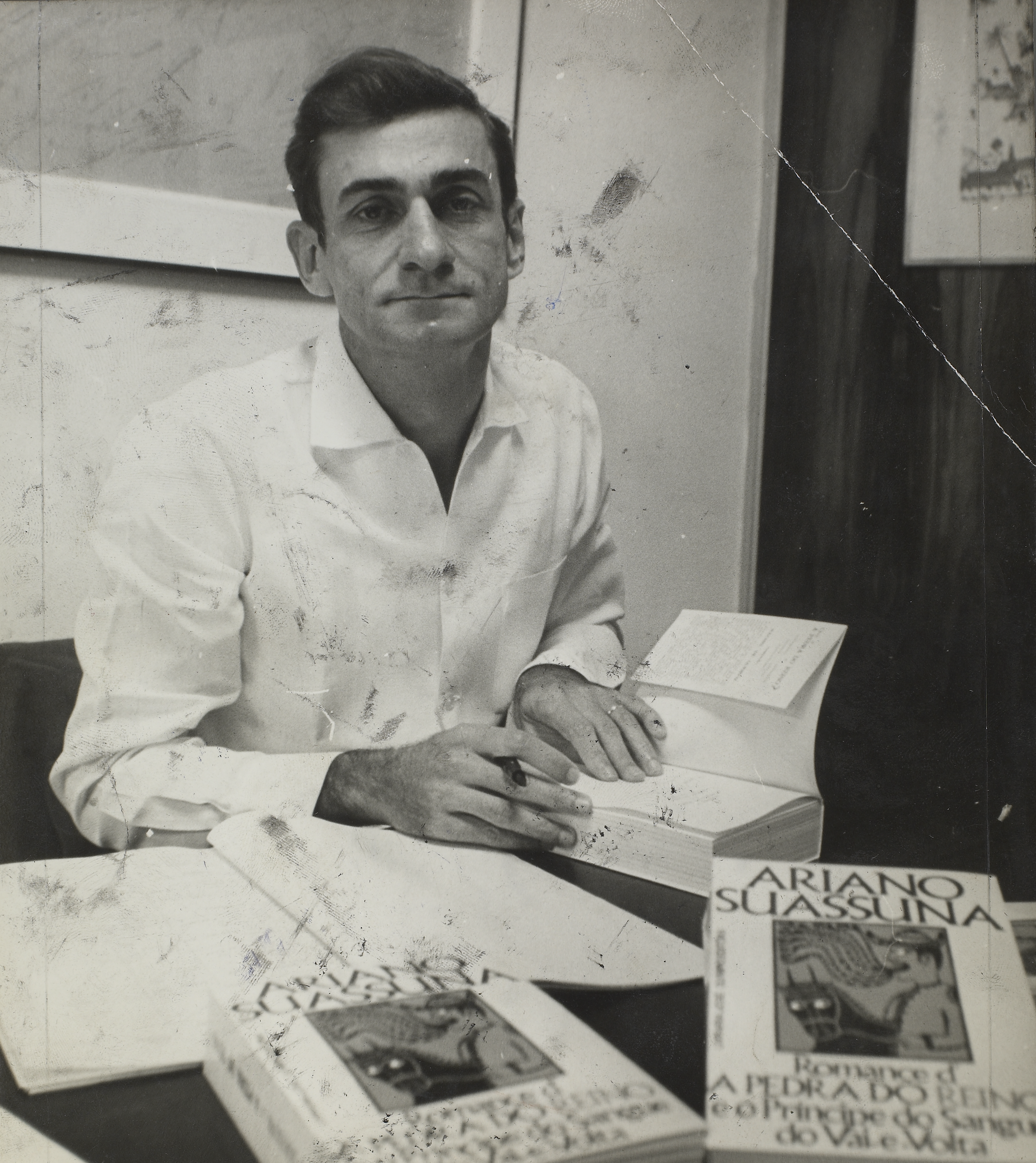
Sertanejo writer Ariano Suassuna used the Northeastern dialect's uniqueness and comedic effect as a theme in his plays, helping with popularizing it outside of the Brazilian Northeast.

=== Sample Text ===
Article 2 of the Universal Declaration of Human Rights in standard written Brazilian Portuguese.

Todo ser humano tem capacidade para gozar os direitos e as liberdades estabelecidas nesta Declaração, sem distinção de qualquer espécie, seja de raça, cor, sexo, língua, religião, opinião política ou de outra natureza, origem nacional ou social, riqueza, nascimento, ou qualquer outra condição.

Article 2 of the Universal Declaration of Human Rights in mediatic Paulistano dialect IPA.

ˈtodu seɾuˈmɐ̃nu tẽj kɐpɐsiˈdɐd͡ʒi ˈpaɾɐ goˈzɐɾ us d͡ʒiˈɾejtus i ɐs libeɾˈdad͡ʒis estɐbeleˈsidas ˈnɛstɐ deklɐɾɐˈsɐ̃w, sẽj d͡ʒistĩˈsɐ̃w d͡ʒi k͡wɐwˈkɛɾ esˈpɛcij, ˈseʒɐ d͡ʒi ˈʁɐsɐ, koɾ, ˈsɛksu, ˈlĩgwɐ, ʁeliʒiˈɐ̃w, opiniˈɐ̃w poˈlit͡ʃika ow d͡ʒi ˈowtɾɐ nɐtuˈɾezɐ, oˈɾiʒẽj nɐsiõˈnɐw ow sosiˈaw, ʁiˈkezɐ, nɐsiˈmẽtu, ow k͡wɐwˈkɛɾ ˈowtɾɐ kõd͡ʒiˈsɐ̃w.

Article 2 of the Universal Declaration of Human Rights in Central Northeastern dialect IPA.

ˈtodu seɾuˈmɐ̃nu tẽj kapɐsiˈdadi pa gɔˈzɐ uɦ diˈɾet͡ʃu i ɐɦ libɛʁˈdɐdi iʃtɐbeleˈsidɐ ˈnɛʃtɐ dɛklɐɾɐˈsɐ̃w, sẽj diʃtĩˈsɐ̃w di k͡wawˈkɛ isˈpɛsi, ˈseʒɐ di ˈhasɐ, ko, ˈsɛksu, ˈlĩgwɐ, hiliʒiˈɐ̃w, opiniˈɐ̃w puˈlitika o di otɐ natuˈɾezɐ, oˈɾiʒi nasiõˈnɐw o sɔsiˈaw, hiˈkezɐ, nasiˈmẽtu, o k͡wawˈkɛ otɐ kõdiˈsɐ̃w.

=== Vocabulary ===
Central Northeastern and North Coast Portuguese have several words that don't exist or have fallen out of use in other Portuguese dialects.

Word	IPA pronunciation	Standard Portuguese equilavent	Meaning
Abestalhado	ɐbeʃtɐjˈadu	Idiota	Idiot
Aperreado	ɐpihiˈadu	Estressado	Stressed
A pulso	ɐˈpusu	Forçadamente	Forcedly
Arrudiar	ɐhudiˈa	Dar a volta	To walk around something
Avexado	/ɐvɛˈʃadu/ or /ɐhɛˈʃadu/	Apressado	In a hurry
Cabrunco	kɐˈbɾũku		Corruption of 'carbuncle', used as a swear
Canso	ˈkɐ̃sŭ		Corruption of 'cancer', used as a swear
Derradeiro	dɛhɐˈdeɾu	Último	Last
Eita	ˈet͡ʃɐ		Interjection
Fastio	fɐʃˈtiw	Sem fome	Hungerless
Gabiru	gɐbiˈɾu	Rato	Rat
Jerimum	ʒiɾiˈmũ	Abóbora	Pumpkin
Macaxeira	mɐkɐˈʃeɾɐ	Mandioca	Cassava
Mangar	mɐ̃ˈga	Zuar	To mock
Mode	ˈmɔdĭ	Por causa	Becausa
Muriçoca	muɾiˈsɔkɐ	Mosquito	Mosquito
Nas brenhas	nɐɦ ˈbɾẽj̃ɐ	Longe	Far away
Nas carreiras	nɐɦ kɐˈheɾɐ	Rápido	Fast
Oxente	/oˈʃẽti/ or /ŏˈʃẽ̆/		Interjection
Oxi	ˈoʃi		Interjection
Percata	pɛɦˈkatɐ	Chinelo	Sandal
Peste	ˈpɛʃti		Plague, used as a swear
Quenga	ˈkẽgɐ	Biscate	Promiscuous woman
Quiço	ˈkisŭ		Weaker version of "canso"
Rapariga	hɐpɐˈɾigɐ	Puta	Bitch
Ruma	ˈhumɐ	Muito	A lot
Vôte	ˈvoːti		Interjection
Vixi	/viˈʃi/ or /ˈviʃː/		Interjection
Xibiu	ʃiˈbiw	Buceta	Vagina
Zuada	zuˈadɐ	Barulho	Noise

== Society and culture ==
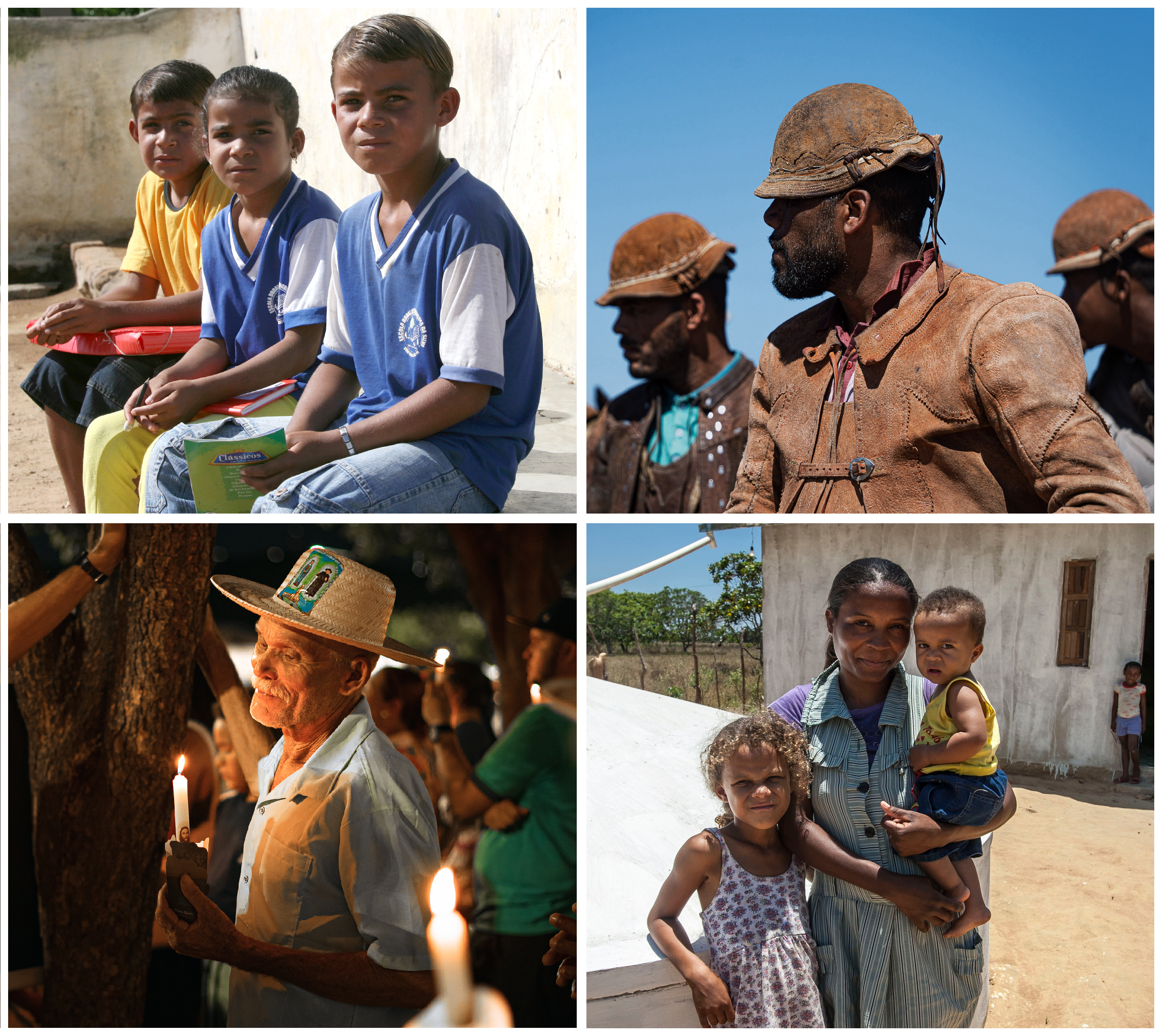
Sertanejos of varied ages and genders.

Sertanejos are socially conservative and religious; over two thirds of northeasterners opposed masturbation, oral sex, anal sex and homosexuality as of 2005; higher numbers than the national average of Brazil. Changes in the social views around these themes during the 2010s and 2020s caused these numbers to decrease, but the region is still more conservative than the south and southeast of the country, especially in the sertão and rural areas. Premarital sex is normal and accepted. Sertanejos value personality traits such as courage, manliness, extroversion, family honor, strength, resilience, hierarchical respect towards parents, stoicism and faith.

Interracial marriage and relationships are normal and very socially accepted, with 34% of all marriages in northeastern Brazil being interracial. Most Sertanejos are phenotypically pardo (60 to 70%), meaning they have a skin color that is too dark to be counted as white and too light to be considered black; however, light and dark skinned Sertanejos are also considerable in numbers (20 to 30% and 10 to 15% respectively). The majority of Sertanejo families are multiracial and diverse in appearance.

=== Social organization ===
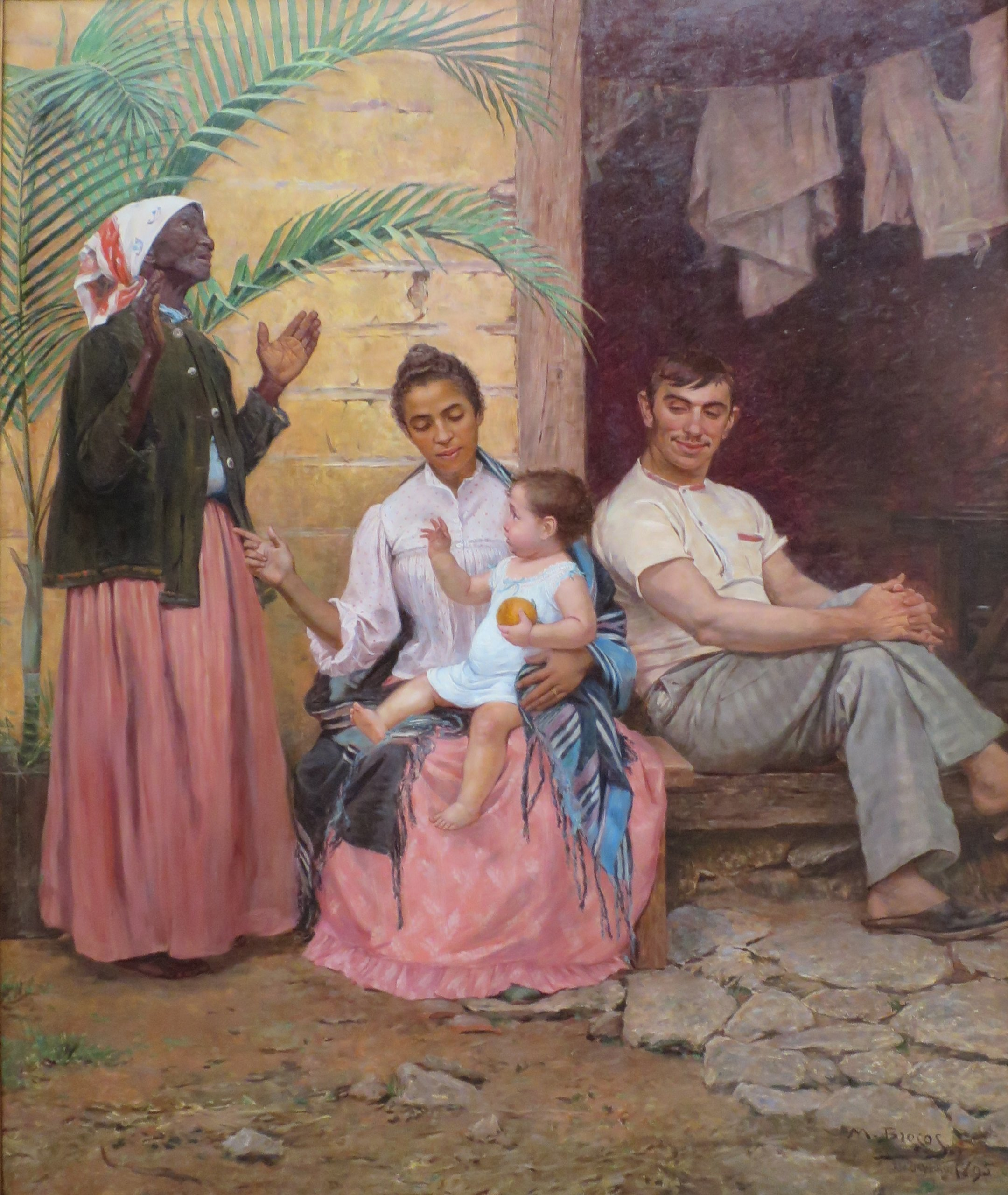
A Redenção de Cam, by Galician painter Modesto Brocos, 1895.

Sertanejo society is traditionally bilineal, meaning that inheritance of wealth and surname come from both the maternal and paternal sides, with equal distribution among the children independently of their gender. Despite this, Sertanejo culture is generally regarded as more male-centered and masculine when compared to other Brazilian cultures. Both nuclear an extended family households are common, people tend to marry rather early, averaging in the low 20s for women and mid 20s for men, but it is common for young men and women to live with their parents until their late 20s to early 30s. Upon marriage, the couple begins to gather money through their own work and monetary help of the parents in order to build a house, the husband usually builds the house with his own labour and with the help of friends, although this practice is becoming less common today.

The more equal land distribution of the sertão and agreste and the lack of industrialization during the 20th century resulted in a population that is spread across thousands of villages and small towns rather than the more centralized cities of the coast, this characteristic paired with the extremely high fertility rates of the region in the past century, when families with 10 or more children were common, caused the rates of endogamy to be rather high, with people often marrying second and third degree cousins, many times without awareness of their blood relation. Cousin marriage is not frowned upon among Sertanejos. Despite cousin marriage being historically prohibited by the Catholic church, the low population density in early colonial societies led them to loosen the marriage laws in Spanish and Portuguese Latin America.

=== Architecture ===
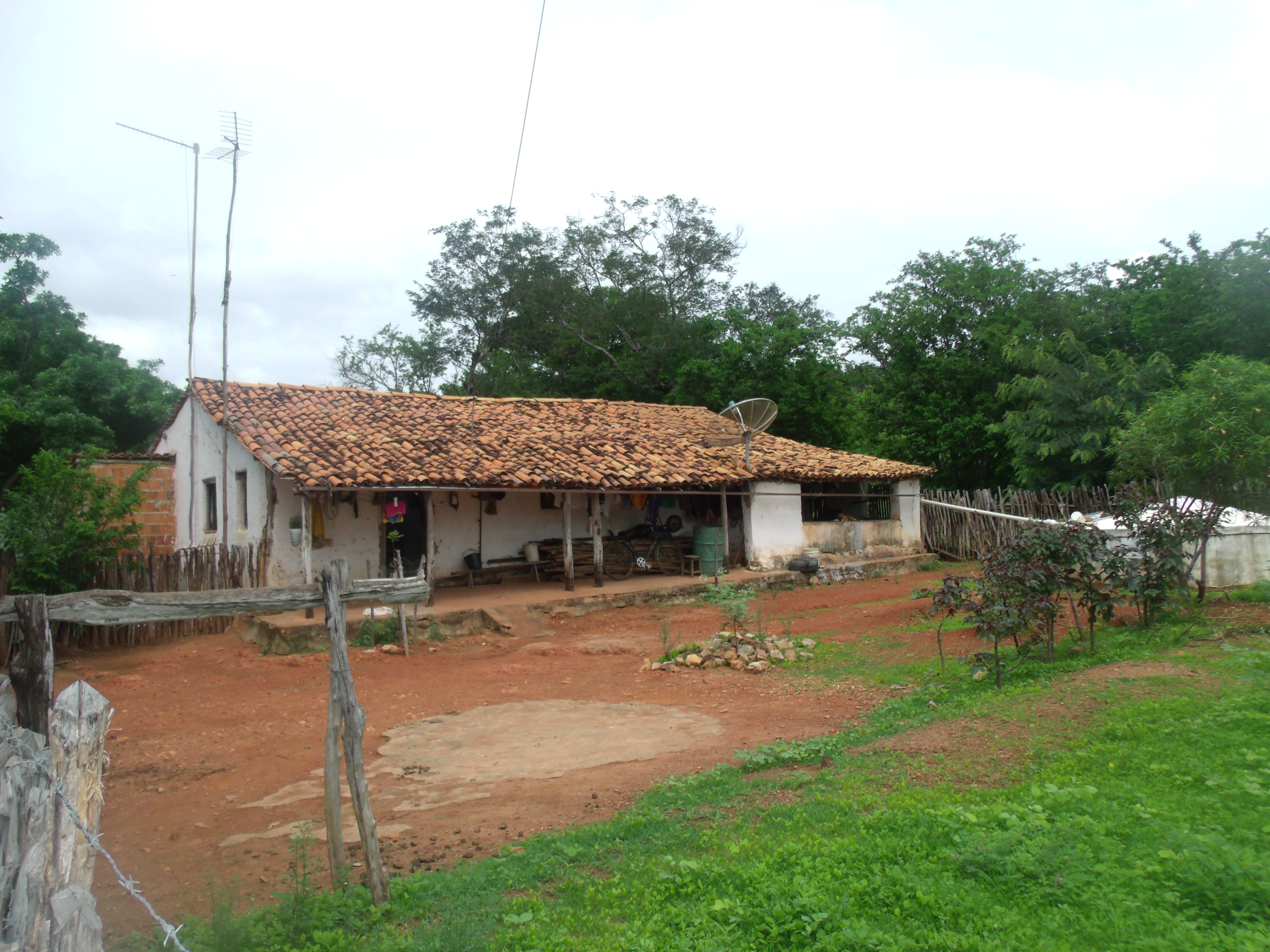
Typical rural early to mid 20th century Sertanejo household in Coreaú, Ceará.

Sertanejo households are similar in style to those of the Iberian peninsula, being traditionally made with adobe or small solid clay bricks and painted white in order to redirect the sunlight, making the temperature inside the house lower than outside of it. Starting in the 20th century larger clay bricks with 6 holes that allowed for a lower weight, easier transport and greater resistance to weight became the norm. Roofs are made from monk and nun style red clay colonial mission tiles sustained by wooden beams, common across the mediterranean and Latin America and ideal for the local climate of the Sertanejo heartland; families with a decent economic standing are able to extend the roof of the house beyond the walls on all 4 directions of the building, which minimizes solar contact with the walls and makes the internal temperature even lower. Houses often have ways to collect rainwater and store it in cisterns for use during drier months of the year.

The Northeast is the most windy part of Brazil and the direction of the winds is constant year-round, this charactestic allows for the exploitation of the wind in Sertanejo architecture; as houses will often have chimney-like structures that give way for the strong winds to blow inside the structure to help with cooling. Houses are usually longer than they are wide, having a backyard behind the house with fruit trees, a garden and chicken coops. The presence of hammocks is very widespread, a cultural tradition inherited from the local Amerindians, up until the mid 20th century people usually slept in hammocks rather than beds, as the latter was too expensive for lower-class families until industrial manufacturing became the norm. Sertanejos value home ownership and the acquisition of land as a mean of building generational wealth for the family, the majority of Sertanejo families own the houses they live in, with homeownership rates sitting around 70-80%, higher than the national average. Houses are usually also painted white in the interior and have ceramic tiles in the floor, which are to be kept tidy. Sertanejos traditionally remove footwear before entering the house in order to avoid staining the floor.

=== Livelihood ===
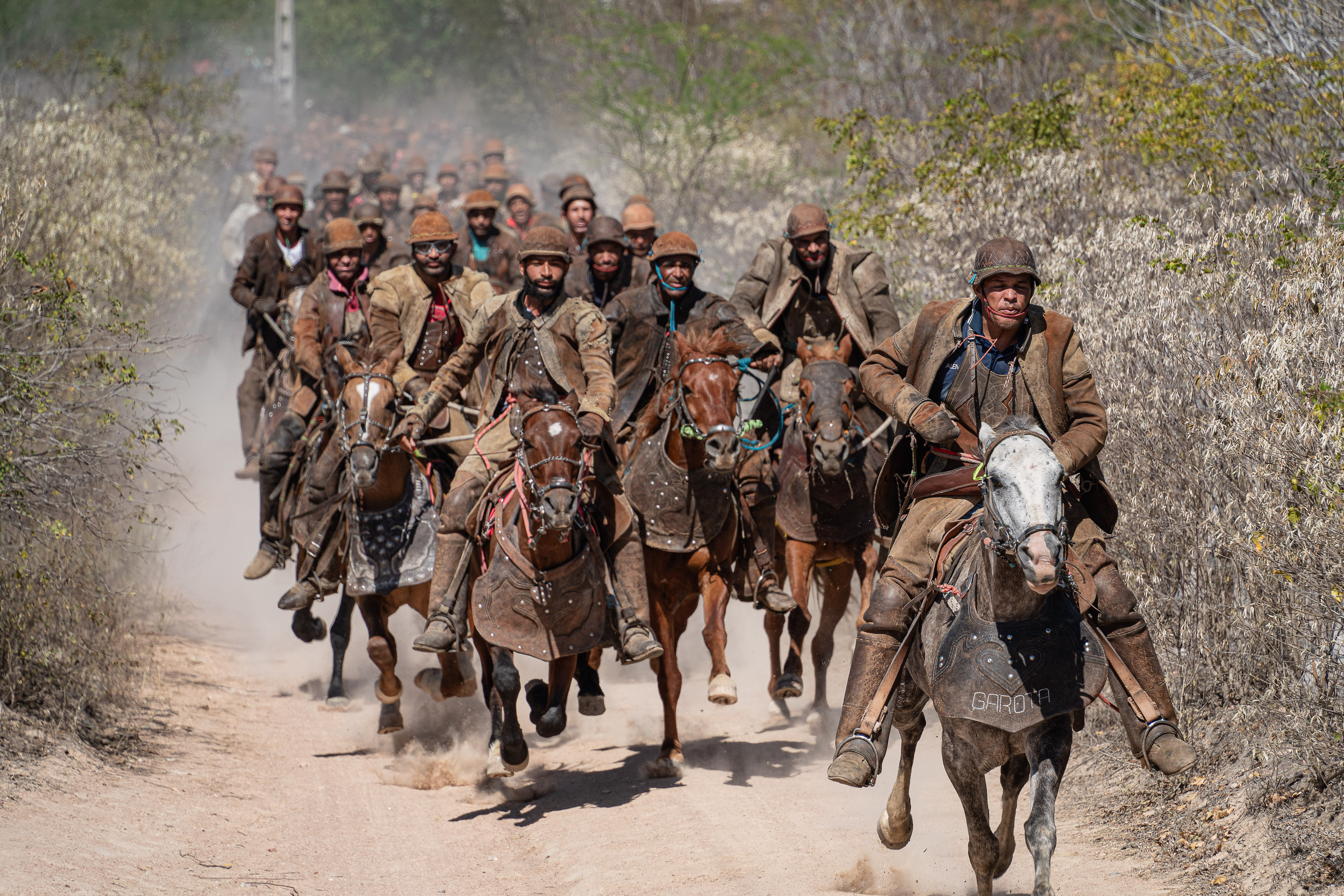
Sertanejos participating in a "pega de boi", Arcoverde, 2023.

Sertanejos nowadays are no longer mostly herders, improvement in water infrastructure, drought remediation, modern fertilizers, tractors and other technological advancements brought by the green revolution made agriculture way more viable in the region. However, farming outside of the São Francisco valley is still only possible for one planting cycle per year, with two in the agreste during rainier La Niña years. In the São Francisco valley a wide array of vegetables, fruits and water-intensive crops are cultivated, which has accelerated the process of desertification in the area due to the loss of native flora, in the rest of the Sertanejo heartland corn, cassava and beans are still the main crops. Most Sertanejos follow a style of family agriculture rather than the large scale monocropping of the northeastern coast and center-west of Brazil.

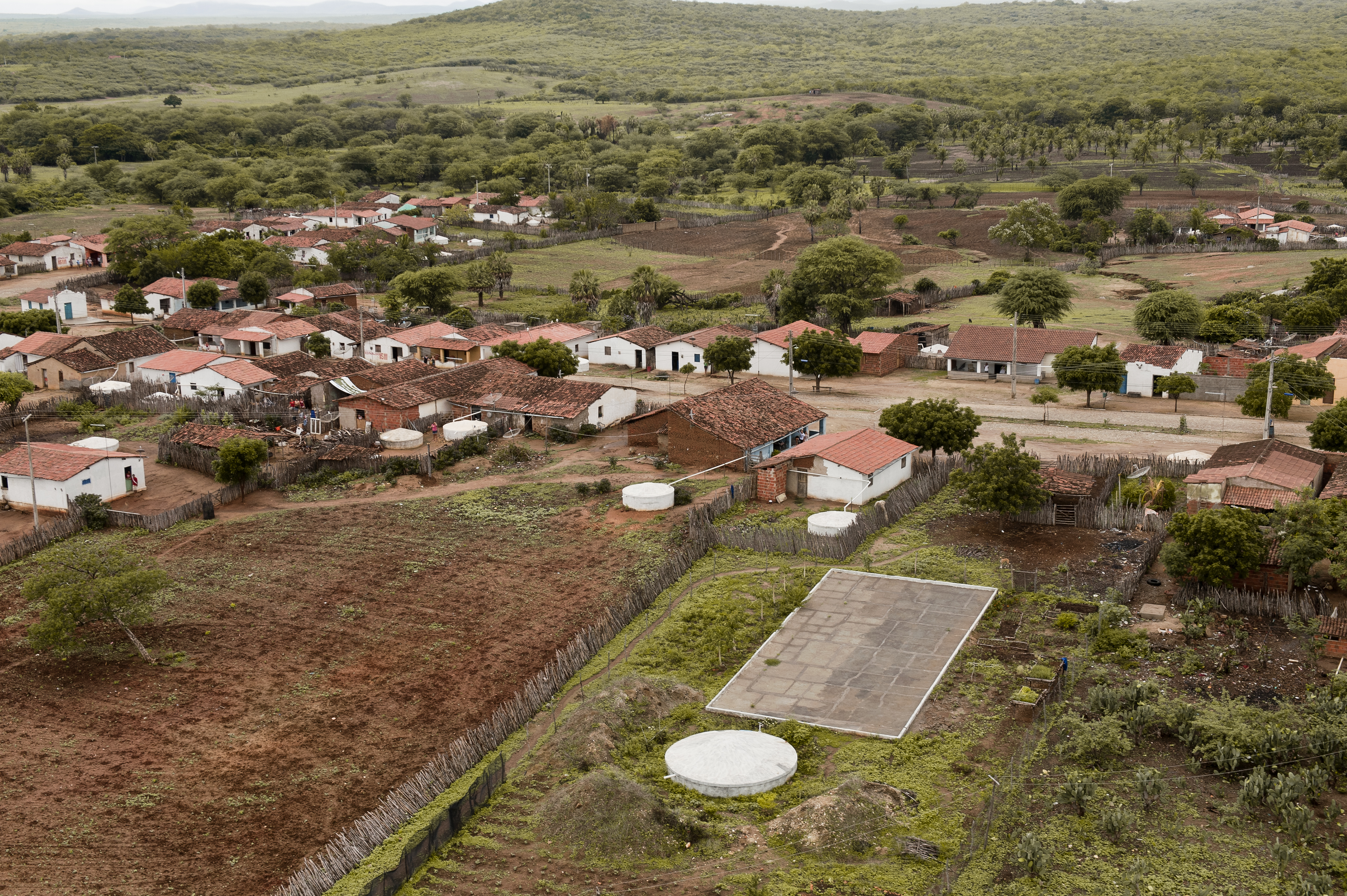
Typical Sertanejo village. Madalena, Ceará.

Since the 20th century areas such as industry, construction, services and commerce have grown a lot in the region. Many Sertanejo men have jobs in the coastal capitals as construction workers during the weekdays and return to their homes in the semiarid during the weekend. The Sertanejos still maintain the old medieval Portuguese tradition of holding weekly outdoors markets, where food and clothing are sold by local tailors, artisans and family farmers. These markets follow a set cycle in which each day of the week a market is held in a specific village or town, sometimes multiple markets are held in a week in larger towns due to the high demand.

=== Religion ===
The Sertanejos are overwhelmingly catholic. Despite the introduction of American style evangelicalism and other Protestant denominations in Brazil starting in the late 20th century, the sertão remains as the most catholic subregion of the country, with 70 to 80% of the population being adept of Roman Catholicism according to the 2022 census, but with numbers that surpassed the 90% mark until the 1980s and 95% until the 1950s. As a result, Catholicism is one of the founding cultural pillars of the Sertanejos, playing a role in their identity and moral values. Afro-Brazilian religions such as umbanda and candomblé are also present and play a relevant role in cultural influence via syncretism.

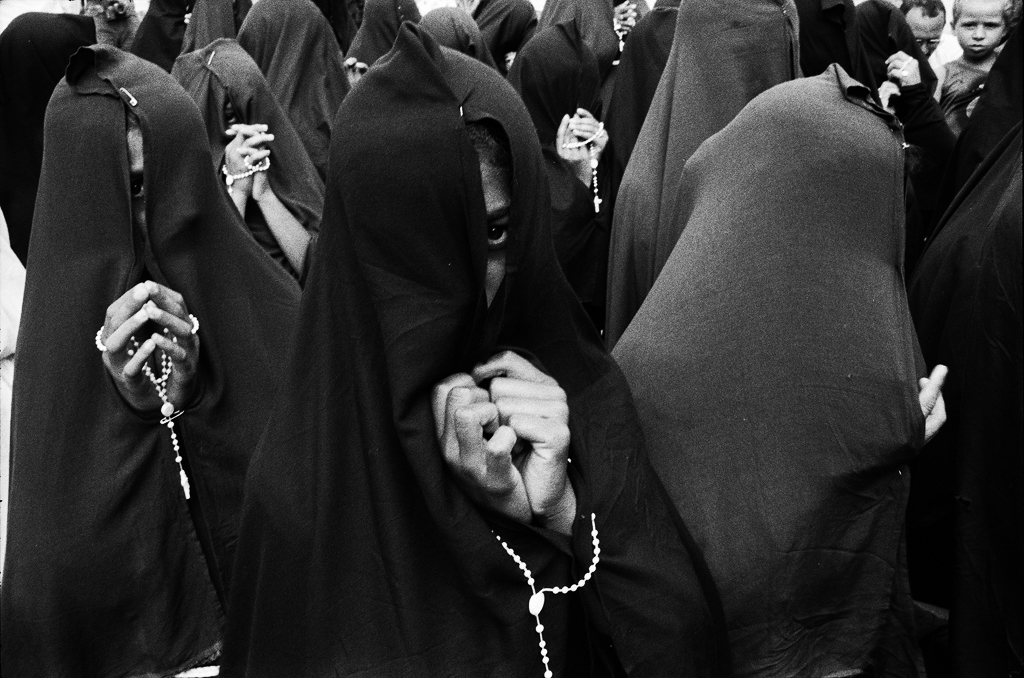
Penitents in Sergipe, 2004.

The vast majority of people are baptized as babies, those who remain unbaptized are called "pagans" in more traditional areas of the countryside and are said to turn into werewolves during lent. Divorce used to be frowned upon until the late 20th century, but is normal today. Despite this, marriages in the northeast of Brazil last an average of 13,3 years, the highest among the country's regions. Sertanejos tend to follow the catholic lent traditions of avoiding red meat and instead consuming fish and seafood. One of the main lent customs among them is the march of the penitents, anonymous capirote-wearing religious people who walk at nighttime from the churches to cemeteries, where they conduct prayers for the dead and produce noise with crotalums; acts of self flagellation may also occur during those marches. Another tradition is the occurrence of theatrical street reenactings of the last hours of Jesus and the crucifixion.

Sertanejos have the practice of keeping patron saints and holding yearly novenas for them, every town, city and village has its own patron saint. A common custom during these novenas is the occurrence of processions, large distance group walks. Sertanejos have a tradition of erecting crucifixes in sections of roadsides where accidents have taken place and claimed the life of people. Open casket funerals are the norm and children are allowed and encouraged to take a last look at the face of the dead family member, the vast majority of Sertanejos are buried rather than cremated. Asking your parents and older relatives for blessings is a common way of greeting in their culture.

=== Festivities ===
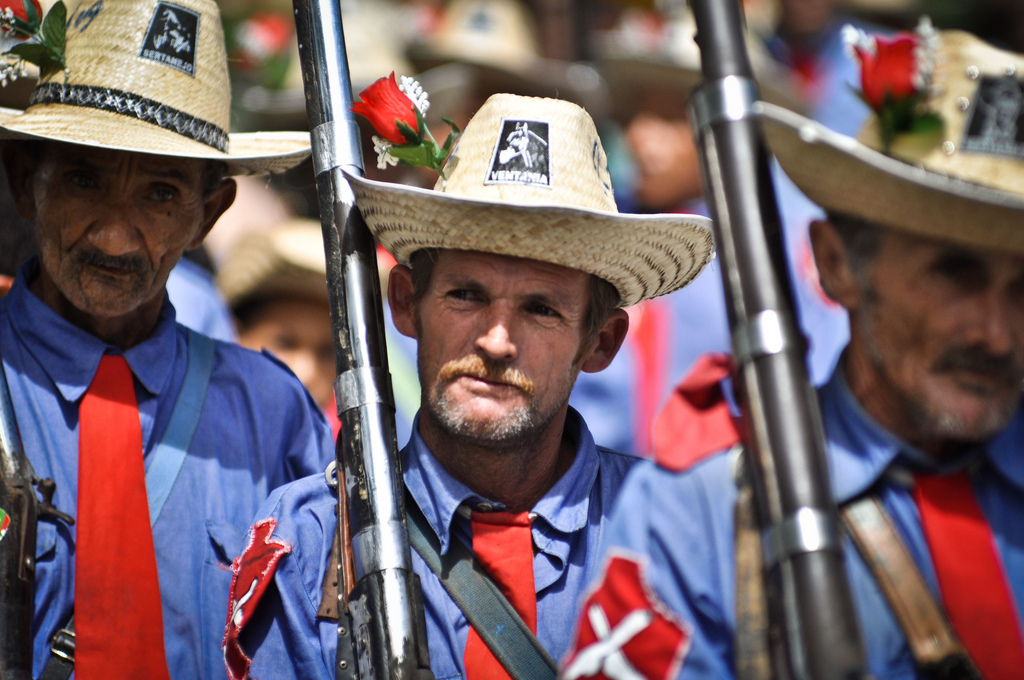
Bacamarteiros in Pernambuco, 2011.

São João is the most popular Sertanejo festivity, it has origins in the medieval European festivities to Saint John the Evangelist. São João takes place during the month of June and coincides with planting season in the agreste and harvest season in the sertão. Traditional customs of the festivity include quadrilhas (organized group of dancers), forró and baião music, peanut and corn based dishes and sweets, use of explosives, bunting decoration, and bonfires. Another winter custom of the Sertanejos is the practice of shooting with a bacamarte (blunderbuss).

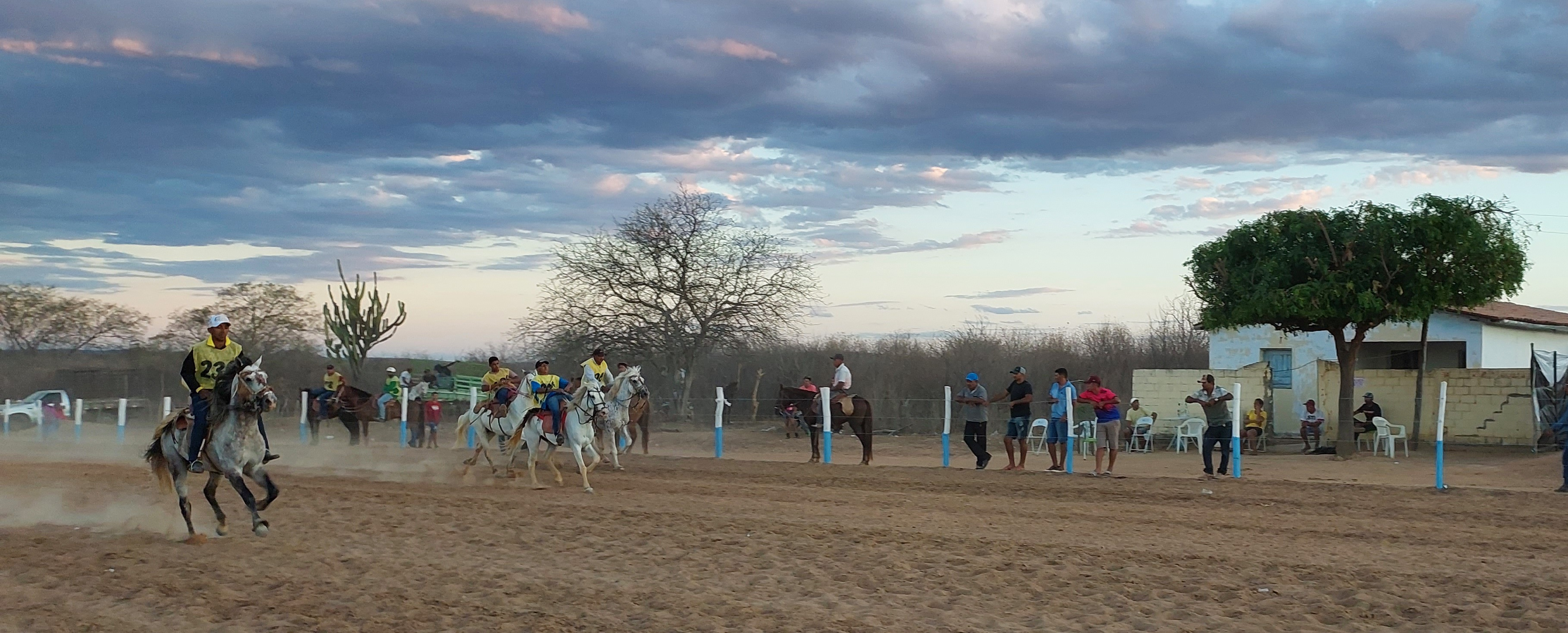
Vaquejada in the interior of Piauí.

The vaquejada is a cultural expression of the Sertanejo people that had roots in the early 17th century and the practice of cattle herding. The original vaquejada is a sport and festifity in which cowboys on horseback pursue a bull with the objective of knocking it over. In the last 15 years animal rights movements pressure on local governments and changes in the societal views around treatment of livestock animals for entertainment have made the original style of vaquejada rarer, but they still occur in deeper areas of the countryside. Today, a form of vaquejada that doesn't include bulls or mistreatment of animals is more common. This version of vaquejada consists of music shows, alcohol consumption and riding horses in urban areas and villages for leisure, in large vaquejadas hundreds to thousands of horses can be present in a settlement.

=== Music and literature ===
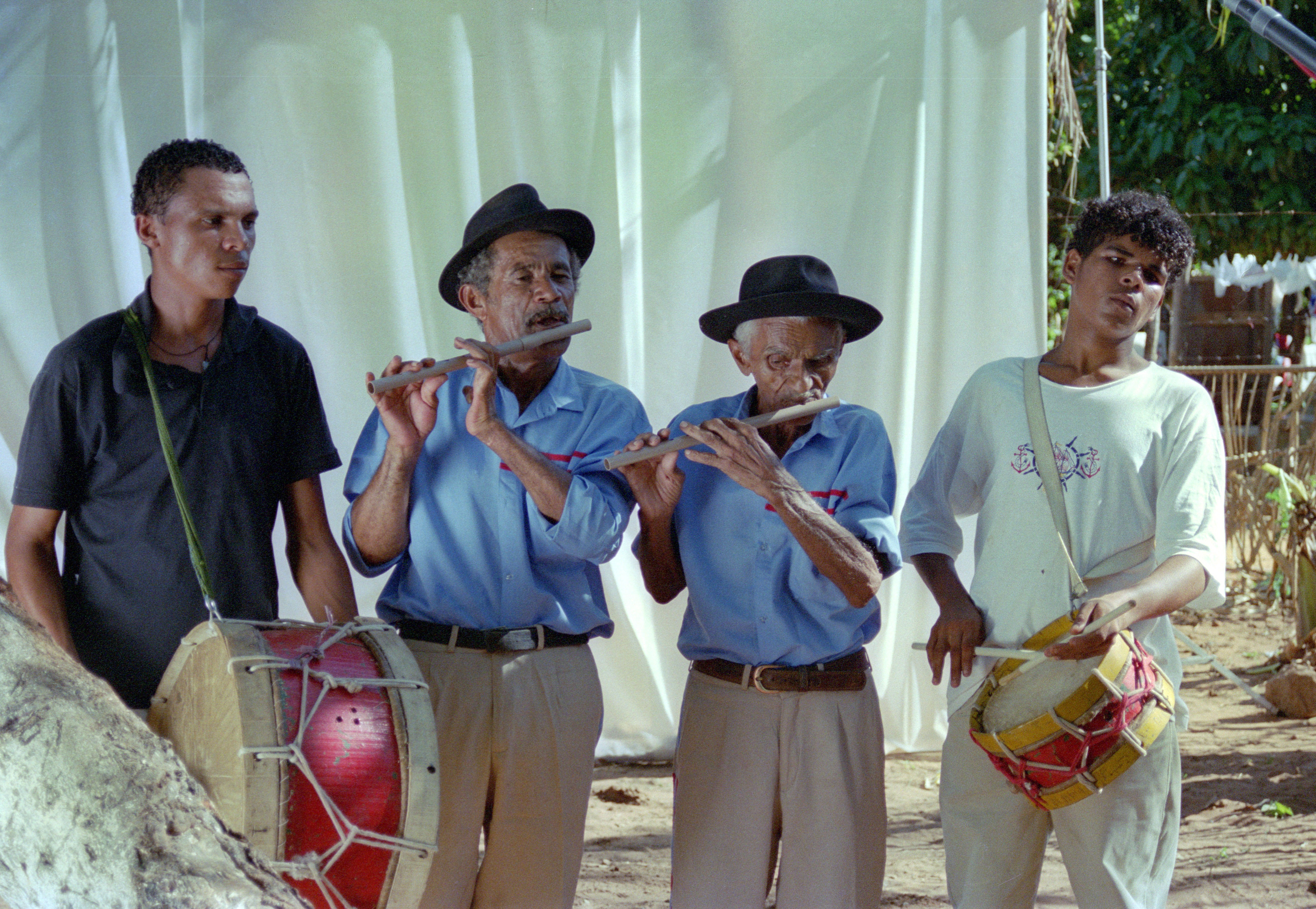
Traditional Pífano band in Crato, Ceará.

The main music genres created by the Sertanejo people are the forró, xaxado, baião and pé de serra, which are also dance styles. The most famous musician Sertanejo musician was Luiz Gonzaga, popularly known in Brazil as the "king" of baião. Another musical cultural manifestation of the Sertanejos is the aboiar, a type of traditional cattle call that was later adapted to be used as a form of telling stories and singing poetry. The traditional instruments used by the Sertanejos are accordions, triangles and the pífano flute. The main manifestation of Sertanejo literature is cordel literature.

=== Cuisine ===
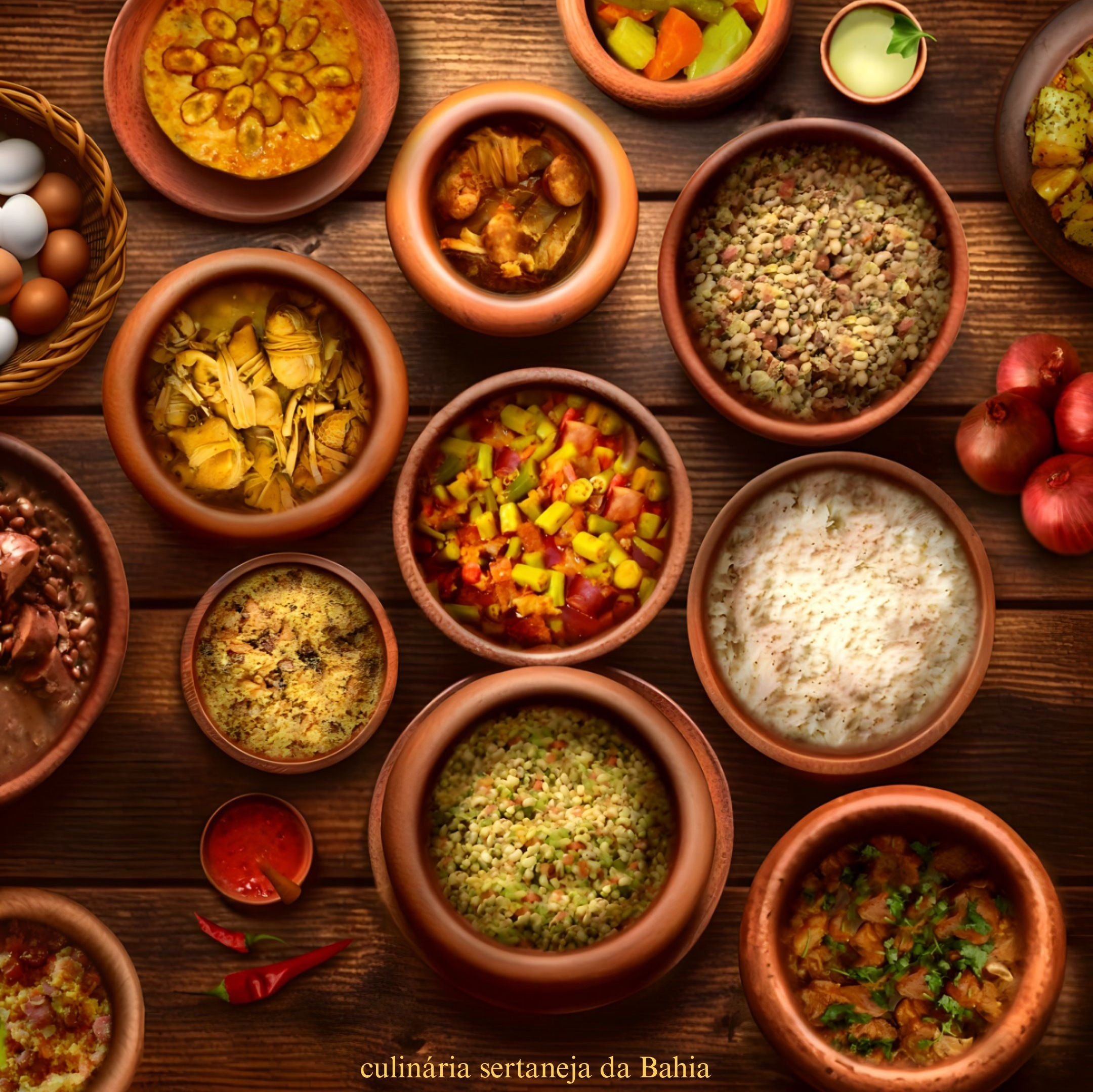
Bahia's Sertanejo dishes.

The most popular Sertanejo food is the cuscuz nordestino, a staple dish created by the adaptation of the original maghrebi couscous to the crops of the new world couscous was introduced to Brazil by the Portuguese, who themselves were introduced to the dish during the berber-Arab rule of Iberia under Al-Andalus. Differently from the original, cuscuz uses corn flakes rather than wheat, and is often drenched in milk and accompanied by beef, eggs or fried minas cheese. Among the meats, Sertanejos make use of carne seca, a type of cow meat prepared and seasoned in a traditional manner and dried under the direct sunlight in order to slow down the process of rotting. Other savory Sertanejo dishes include boiled cassava (accompanied by meat and butter), lamb or goat meat, green and tropeiro beans, tapioca, baião de dois (mix of rice, beans and carne de sol), tripa (cow intestines), rolinha (a type of wild bird) buchada de bode (goat organs boiled inside an intestine), mocotó (stewed cow feet) and sarapatel (boiled pig organs and blood).

Sertanejo sweets are mostly peanut or corn based and have a very sugary taste, including paçoca, cocada, pé de moleque, bolo de rolo, mungunzá, bolo de macaxeira, bolo de milho, bolo de leite, doce de caju, tapioca doce, pamonha and canjica.

=== Clothing ===
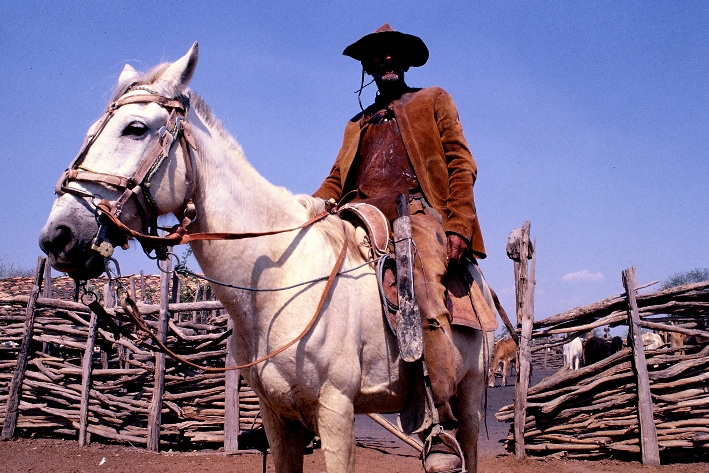
Man in full traditional Sertanejo menswear. Bahia, 2013.

Traditional Sertanejo clothing for men includes long pants, hats, boots and shirts made of cow leather or deer skin; these clothes had the practical use of protecting the wearer from the spiky and harsh flora of the caatinga. These are sometimes accompanied by decorations of silver-colored four petaled flowers and eight points stars, both of which come from traditional Berber and Iberian patterns. More formal vestments for men in occasions such as church attendance and festivities were long pants and shirts made from breathy and light fabrics and white or chesed color, as these characteristics made them comfortable for the hot climate of the region. Women wore long dresses. Today these traditional clothes have mostly fallen out of use, with the exception of leather hats and chesed shirts sometimes worn by older men in everyday contexts. Instead, Sertanejos today use western style pieces, and the old vestments are only used during specific dance events in São João.

== Genetics ==
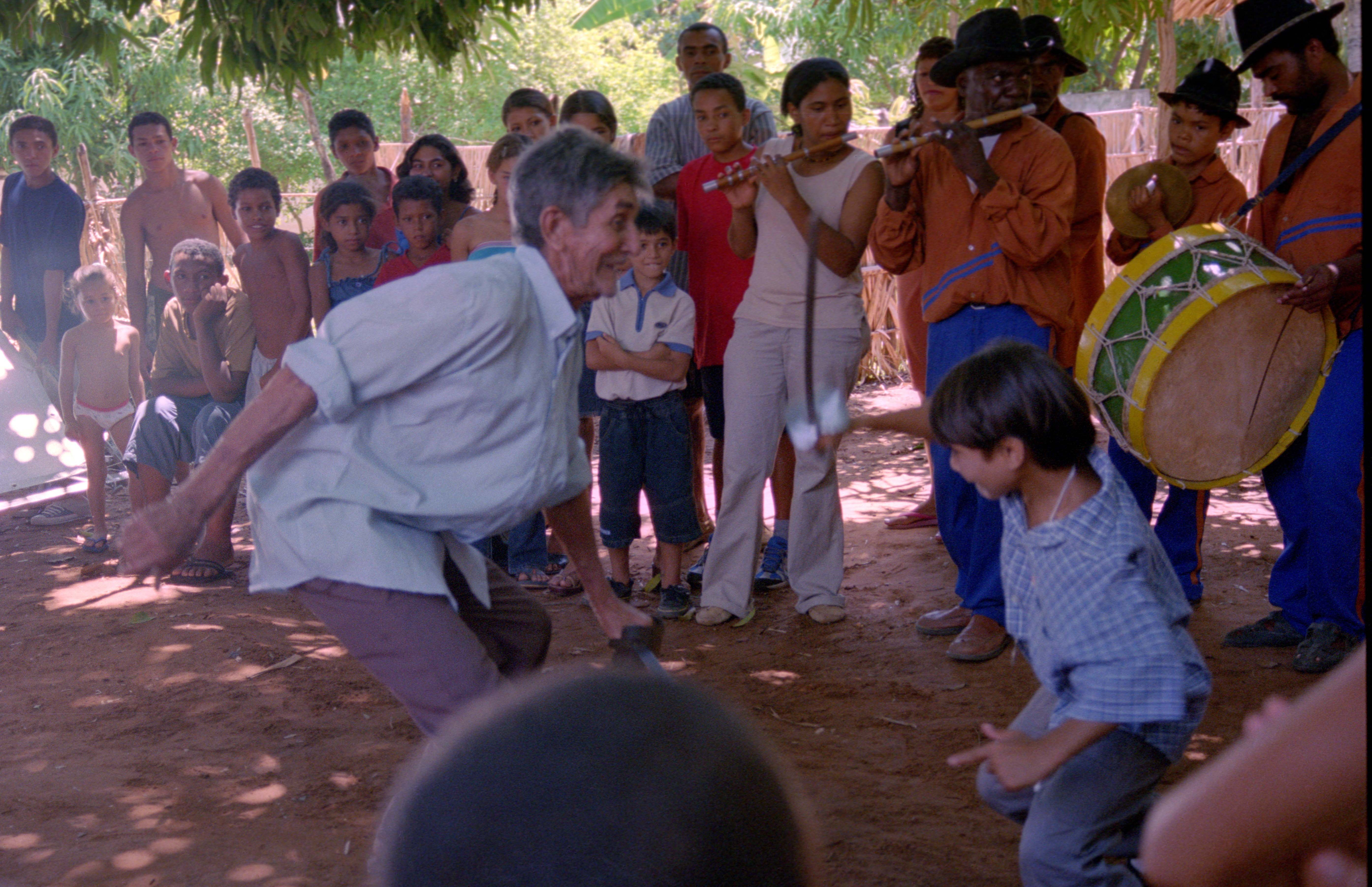
Sertanejos of mixed ancestral background participating in a traditional reisado, 2004.

The Sertanejos are overwhelmingly of mixed ancestral background, with varying amounts of European, African, and indigenous ancestry. The European part of their ancestry is mostly Portuguese and Galician, with smaller amounts of Sephardic Jewish, Spanish and Basque; the indigenous comes from dozens of local Jê and Tupi speaking peoples and the African from Bantu and Niger-Congo peoples that lived in Angola, Congo, Nigeria, Cameroon, Ghana and Benin during the times of the transatlantic slave trade, with lower amounts of ancestry from other nations in Western and Southeastern Africa, as well as the Maghreb.

To this day Sertanejos use the word 'Galego' (lit. 'Galician') to refer to blond or fair skinned people and the verb 'judiar' (lit. 'to jew') as a synonym of "to mistreat" or "to beat", terms inherited from the contact of the early Sertanejo society with Galician immigrants and Conversos.

=== Y DNA and mtDNA ===
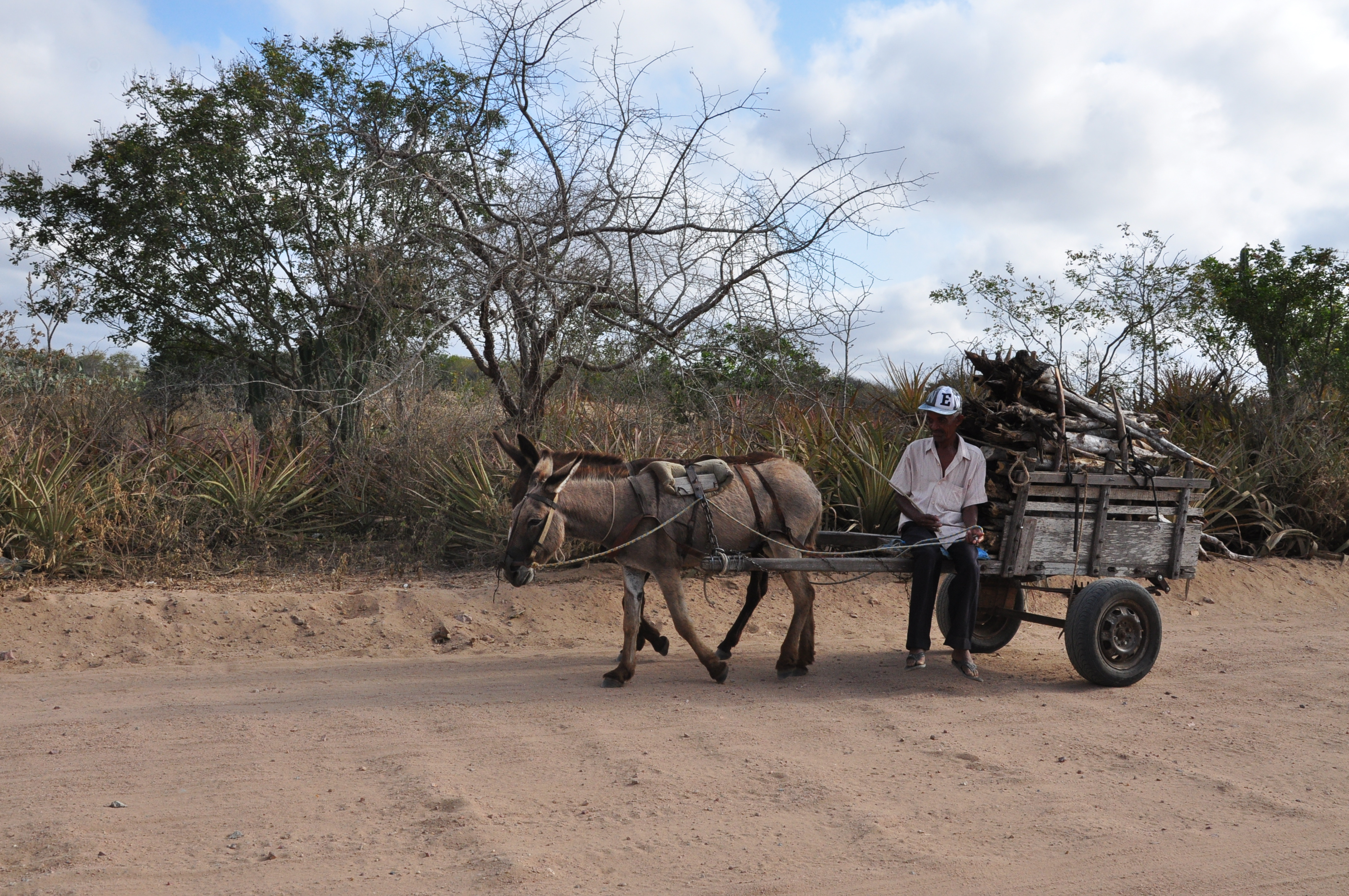
Phenotipically black Sertanejo transporting firewood in a donkey-drawn cart, 2013.

A Y-chromosome study by Schaan et al. (2020) tested 280 individuals from all states of northeastern Brazil for paternal lineages. Haplogroup R-M207 was the most common, being present in 56% of the participants, followed by haplogroups FJ-M213 at 23% and E-P170 at 15%. Another study from 2009 tested 247 men from Alagoas and found the most common haplogroups to be R1b1b2-M269 at 55%, J2-M172 at 7%, J-M304 at 6% and E1b1b1a-M78 at 5%. Overall, the paternal lineages among Sertanejos of northeastern Brazil are overwhelmingly of European origin, while African and Indigenous ones are in the single digits.

Unlike the paternal DNA, the maternal lineages of Sertanejos tends to be more distributed among the three pillar ancestral populations that formed them.

=== Autosomal DNA ===
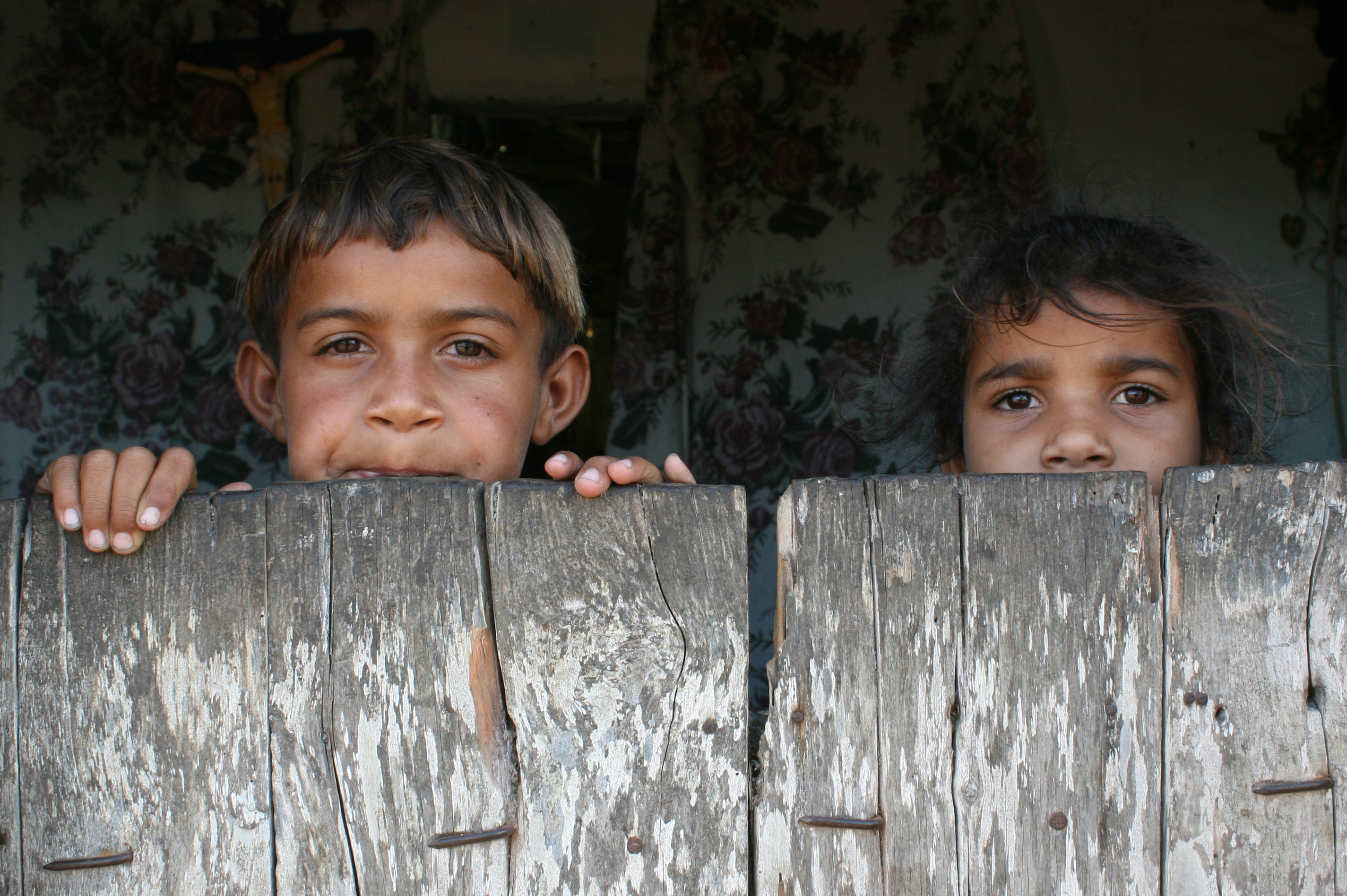
Sertanejo siblings, Pernambuco, 2009.

The Sertanejos are part of a wide genetic cluster that spans from close to the Bantu and West African cluster all the way to the Eurasian ones, such as the Berber, Middle Eastern, European and Amerindian clusters, but rarely overlapping with any of them. This large tri-racial genetic cluster also includes populations such as the Puerto Ricans, Cubans, Colombians, Venezuelans, White Brazilians, Black Brazilians, Pardo Brazilians, Dominicans Ecuadorians, Panamanians and a portion of the individuals from Mexico and Central America.

A 2019 study analyzed the autosomal ancestry of Brazilians from the Northeastern region of the country as being 55% European, 29% African and 16% Amerindian. Another study 2017 looked into the results of 2010 participants who lived specifically in the sertão subregion and found their average autosomal ancestry to be 57% European, 23% African and 20% Amerindian. The African ancestry is lower in the semiarid than in the coast, this happens because historically, the drier interior was unviable for the planting of sugar-cane, and the climate of the area only allowed one planting cycle per year, even for drought resistant crops. Use of slave labour in the sertão was not as profitable, resulting in a lower proportion of enslaved people and less African ancestry in the Sertanejos when compared to the populations from the eastern coast.

== Notable Sertanejos ==
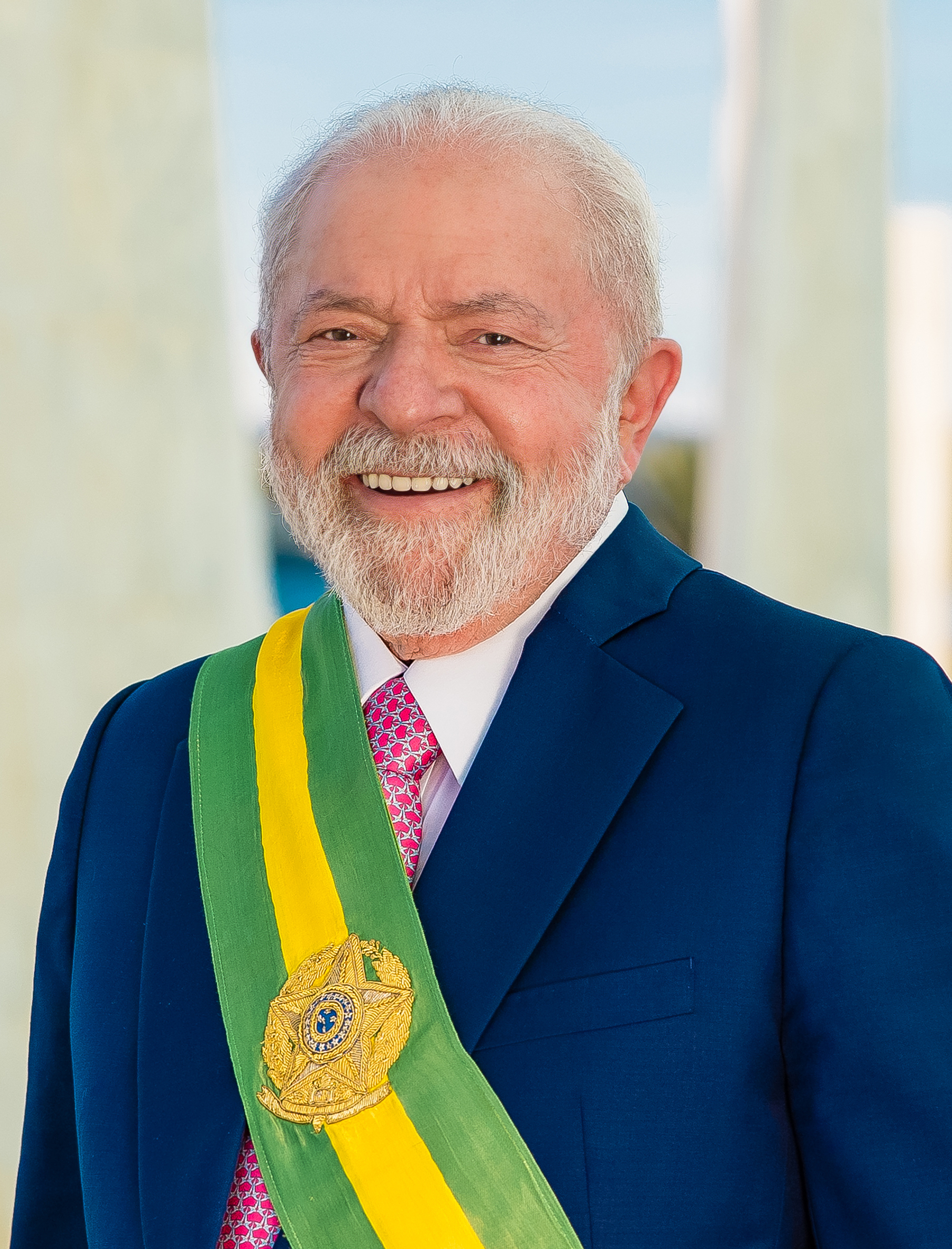
Lula, 35th & 39th president of Brazil.

- Luiz Inácio Lula da Silva - 35th & 39th president of Brazil
- Luiz Gonzaga - musician
- Padre Cícero - priest and Servant of God
- Ariano Suassuna - writer
- Epitácio Pessoa - 11th president of Brazil
- Antônio Conselheiro - preacher
- João Gilberto - musician
- José de Alencar - writer
- Marta - footballer
- Belchior - musician
- Virgulino Ferreira da Silva - bandit
- Renato Aragão – actor
- Diego Costa - Spanish-Brazilian footballer
- José Domingos de Morais - musician
- José Linhares - 15th president of Brazil
- Alceu Valença - musician
- Hulk - footballer
- Fagner - musician
- João Maurício Vanderlei, Baron of Cotegipe - prime minister
- Luva de Pedreiro - comedian
- Zé Ramalho - musician
- Tiririca - comedian and politician
- Whindersson Nunes - comedian
- Hélder Câmara - Servant of God
- Capistrano de Abreu - historian
- Eugênio de Araújo Sales - cardinal of the Roman Catholic Church
- Wagner Moura - actor
- Patativa do Assaré - poet
- Sivuca - musician
- Celso Furtado - economist
- Tobias Barreto - poet and writer
- Sílvio Romero - writer
- Milton Santos - geographer
- Adolfo Caminha - writer

== See also ==
- Sertão
- Northeast Region, Brazil
