= Vaquejada =

Brazilian bull sport

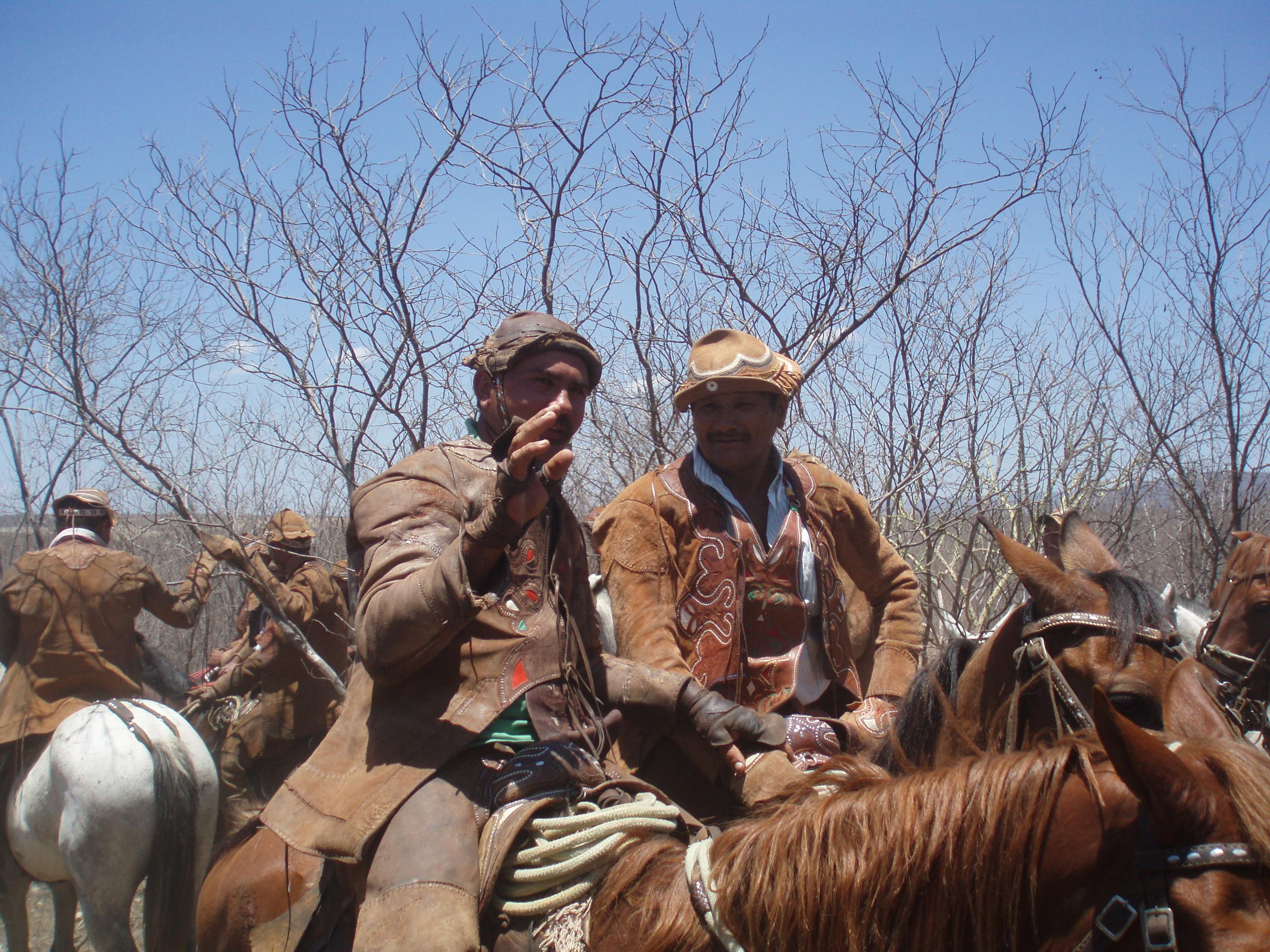

Vaquejada (Brazilian Portuguese pronunciation: [vɐkeˈʒadɐ]) is a sport typical to Northeastern Brazil, in which two cowboys ("vaqueiros") on horseback pursue a bull, seeking to pin it between the two horses and direct it to a goal (often consisting of chalk marks), where the animal is then knocked over.

Vaquejada also refers to a music style derived from forró, pop, and sertanejo, which is used as the soundtrack to this particular sport.

On October 6, 2016, the Brazilian Supreme Court ruled that vaquejada was illegal and against the Brazilian Constitution. The subject came into matter when the Government of the State of Ceará approved a state law regarding the practice. The Attorney General appealed against it to the Supreme Court, stating in the lawsuit that the animals were treated with cruelty. In its favor, the Government of Ceará sustained that it was a cultural event and represented an important part of the local economy. According to the Government of Ceará, vaquejada creates over 200,000 jobs. The Supreme Court's decision had national coverage. On 6 June 2017, Congress passed a constitutional amendment overturning the Supreme Court's ban.

The city with the largest vaquejada in the world is Serrinha, in Bahia state.
