= Maranhense people =

Povo Maranhense
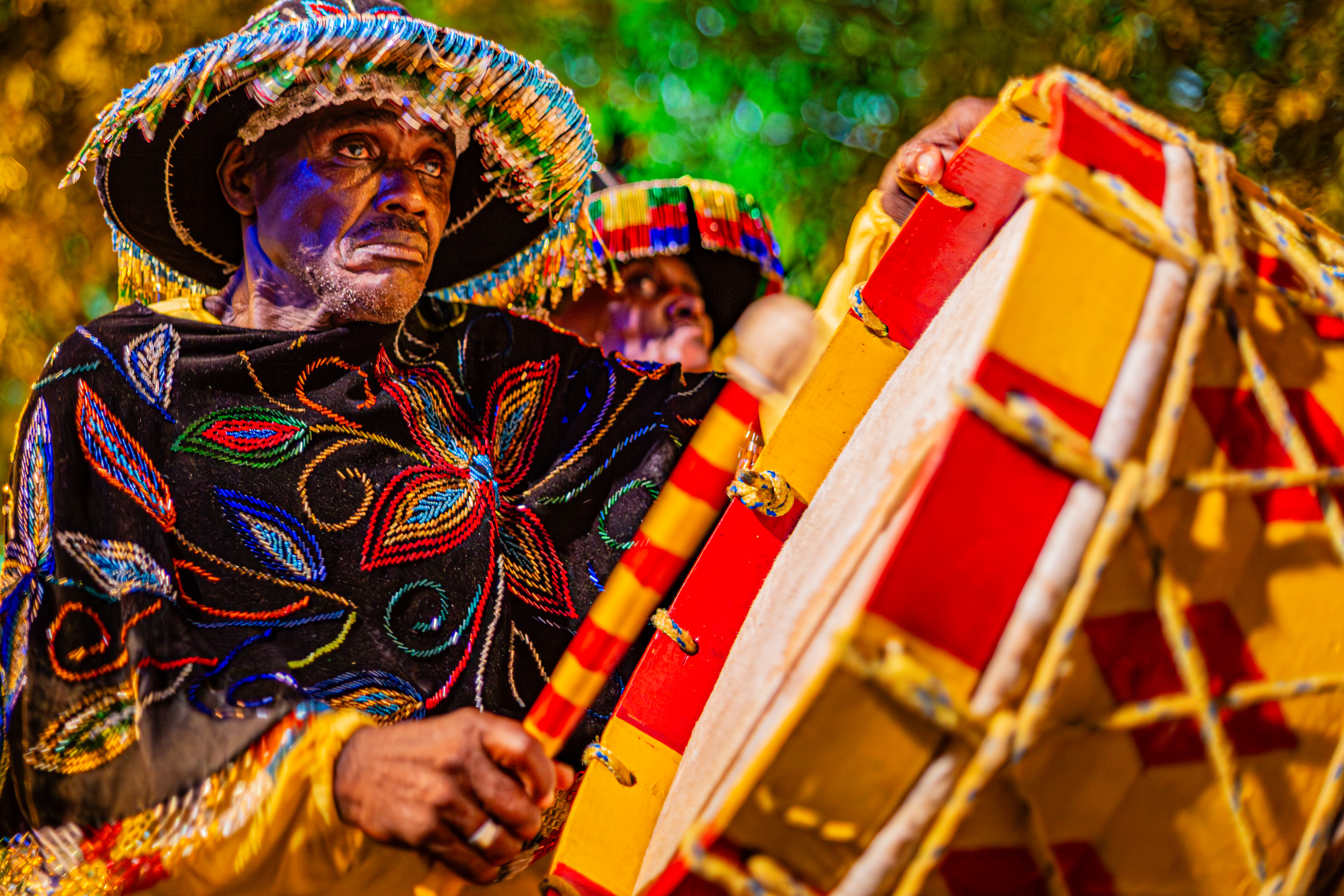
- Maranhense man in a traditional Bumba Meu Boi costume, Guimarães, Maranhão

Total population
- c. 5 million (2022)

Languages
- Portuguese language, Costa Norte and Central Northeastern dialects

Religion
- Predominantly Roman Catholic, sizeable Protestant minority

Related ethnic groups
- Sertanejos, Baianos, Bragantinos, Caboclos, Matutos, Portuguese, Amerindians, Bantus, Wolofs, Fulanis, Mandinkas, Balantas, Manjak, and Serer

The Maranhenses (Natively: [mɐɾɐ̃ˈɲẽsi]) are a Brazilian ethnocultural group distributed across the central, northern and eastern mesoregions of the state of Maranhão, as well as parts of northwestern Piauí; they are speakers of the Costa Norte dialect of Portuguese, with a minority in the south of their region speaking the Central Northeastern dialect.

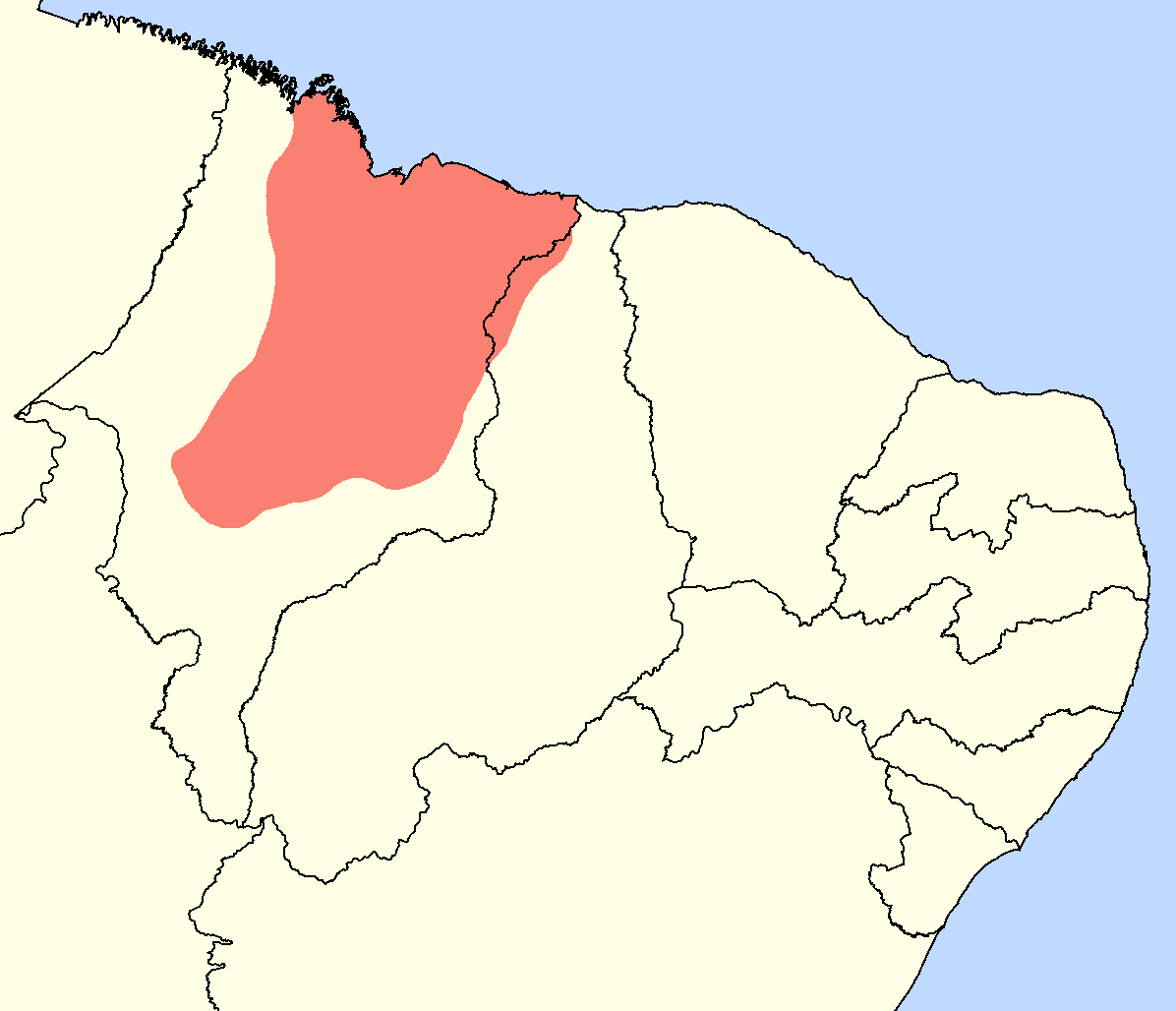
Area inhabited by the Maranhense people (red) over a map of northeastern Brazil.

== History ==
In the early 17th century the Kingdom of France attempted to colonize the bay of São Marcos region, founding the city of São Luís. This colonization attempt was initially successful, as the French were able to erect a decently sized town and export hundreds of ethnic French settlers to the colony, however, the Portugal was eventually able to take the region from France, bringing ethnic Portuguese settlers into São Luís.

The Portuguese began to utilize the lands of Maranhão for the extraction of the "drogas do sertão", with the gathering of spices, nuts and fruits such as Brazil nut, guarana, copaiba, babaçu and urucum, as opposed to the wood extraction economy of southern Bahia, the sugarcane farming of the eastern northeast and the animal husbandry of the caatinga. As such, the adaptation of the European settlers to the new lifestyle and tropical climate of the region and their mixing with local indigenous peoples and enslaved Africans led to a formation of the Maranhense culture.

Differently from the rest of the Brazilian territory, which brought African slaves mostly from the Congo and the Gulf of Guinea, the slave ships that docked in the ports of São Luís and Alcântara mostly came from the Senegambia region, bringing slaves that had different languages, cultures and religions from the ones in the Bantu and Volta-Niger areas. The most common ethnicities of these enslaved Africans included peoples such as the Wolofs, Fulanis, Serer, Mandinkas, Balantas, Manjak, Jolas , Papel, Biafadas and Soninkes.

== Culture ==
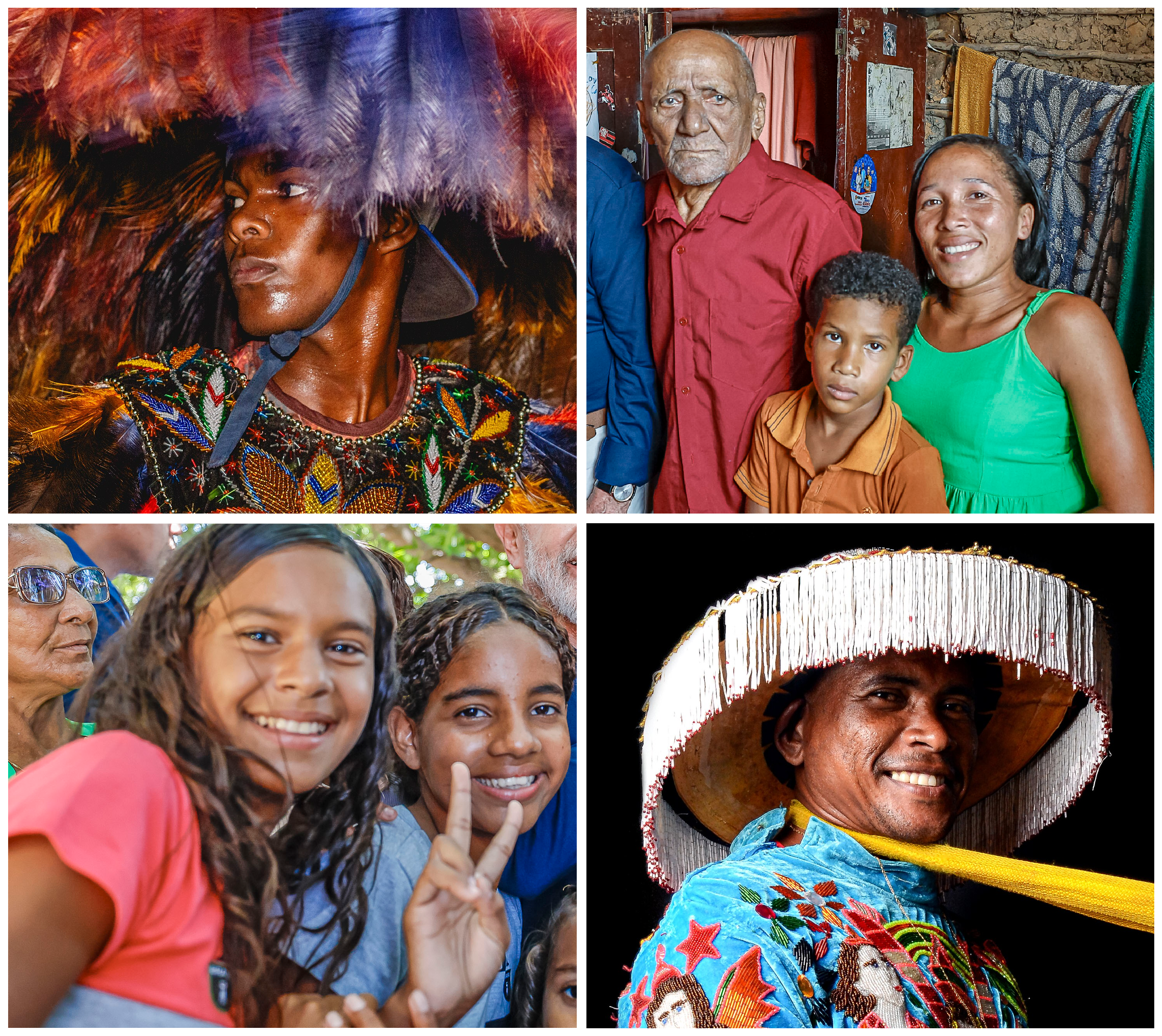
Maranhenses from the São Marcos bay area.

Maranhense culture is mostly influenced by Portuguese and African traditions and customs, with lesser but present influences of French and Indigenous sources. Traditional festivities, dances and music of the Maranhense people include the Bumba Meu Boi, Tambor de Crioula dance, Cacuriá dance, Brazilian Reggae music, Tambor de Mina, Festa do Divino Esprírito Santo, Carnaval de Passarela, festejo de São Marçal, festa da Juçara, among others.

Traditional dishes and sweets include Arroz de Cuxá, Juçara, several crab-based dishes, shrimp-based dishes, Espécie, Bacuri, Buriti and Babaçu. Most Maranhenses are deeply Catholic, with followers of the religion numbering 65 to 75% of the population, while Protestants are 20 to 25%, irreligious people 5 to 10% and followers of Afro-Brazilian religions are less than 1%, as of 2022.

Maranhenses are the Brazilian ethnocultural group with the highest proportion of Quilombolas, people descended from escaped slaves that formed Quilombo villages and settlements in isolated parts of the countryside in order to avoid recapture by their old masters. As of 2022, 4% of the population of Maranhão were Quilombolas.

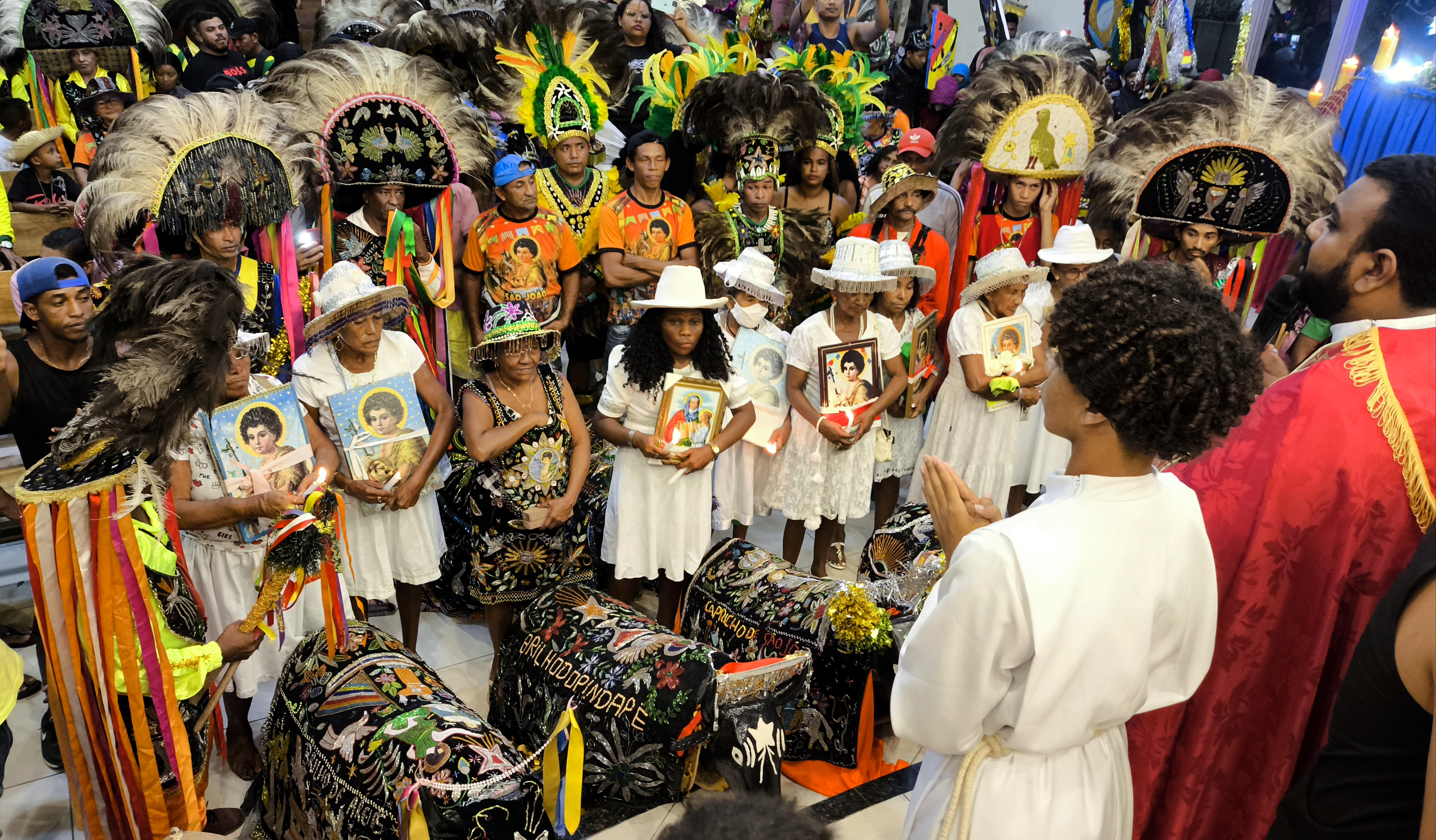
Bumba-Meu-Boi dancers being blessed by a Catholic priest in the municipality of Pindaré-Mirim, 2024.

== Genetics ==
According to the 2022 Brazilian census 65 to 75% of the population of the Maranhense territory self-identified as pardo, 15 to 20% as white and 10 to 15% as black. The vast majority of Maranhenses are mixed to some degree, with varying rates of European, African or Amerindian ancestry. A 2019 systematic scoping review of 51 studies analyzed the autosomal DNA composition of Brazilians from several states and cities and put the average ancestral component of people from the city of São Luís as 42% European, 19% African and 39% Amerindian.

== Notable Maranhenses ==
- José Sarney - 31st president of Brazil
- Alcione Nazareth - musician
- Pablo Vittar - musician
- Gonçalves Dias - poet
- Humberto de Campos - writer
- Augusto Tasso Fragoso - general and military president
- Ferreira Gullar - writer
- Raimundo Nina Rodrigues - polymath
- Joaquim de Sousa Andrade - poet
- Mestre Irineu - founder of Daime
- Zeca Baleiro - musician
- Edison Lobão - politician
- Adelino Fontoura - actor
- Roseana Sarney - sociologist and politician
- Urbano Santos da Costa Araújo - vice president
