= Adelino (given name) =

Adelino is a given name. Notable people with the name include:

- Adelino Fontoura (1859–1884), Brazilian poet and actor
- Adelino da Palma Carlos (1905–1992), Portuguese politician
- Adelino Sitoy (1936–2021), Filipino politician
- Adelino Amaro da Costa (1943–1980), Portuguese politician
- Adelino da Palma Carlos (1905–1992), Portuguese lawyer, scholar, politician and a freemason
- Adelino Mano Quetá (1944–2014), Bissau-Guinean politician
- Adelino Maltez (born 1951), Portuguese lawyer and professor
- Adelino Teixeira (footballer) (born 1952), Portuguese football left-back
- Adelino Castelo David (born 1955), Santomean banker and politician
- Adelino Nunes (born 1960), Portuguese football defensive midfielder
- Adelino Hidalgo (born 1963), Spanish middle distance runner
- Adelino Batista da Silva Neto (born 1973), Brazilian footballer
- Adelino Pestana (born 1992), Angolan handball player
- Adelino (footballer, born 1994), Brazilian football forward
- Adelino Trindade (born 1995), East Timorese football defender
- Adelino Lucas, Santomean politician

== See also ==
- Adelino (disambiguation)
- Estádio Adelino Raul Uagite, Portuguese football stadium for Gil Vicente
- Mocambique, Portuguese football stadium for C.F. União
- Raul Uagite (1908–1977), born Adelino William Gonsalves, American soccer inside-left
- Neno (footballer) (1962–2021), born Adelino Augusto da Graça Barbosa Barros, Portuguese football goalkeeper
- Jordão (footballer, born 1971), born Adelino José Martins Batista, Portuguese football midfielder
- Lino (footballer, born 1976), born Adelino Augusto Lopes, Bissau-Guinean football right-back
- Vieirinha (born 1986), born Adelino André Vieira de Freitas, Portuguese football winger
