= Baiano Portuguese =

Dialect of Portuguese

Bahian Portuguese
- Dialeto Baiano
- Pronunciation: [diaˈlɛtu bajˈɐ̃nu]
- Native to: Brazil
- Region: Bahia, Sergipe, Minas Gerais and Espírito Santo
- Ethnicity: Baianos, Sertanejos and Geraizeiros
- Native speakers: c. 12 million (2022)
- Language family: Indo-European: Italic; Romance; Portuguese; Brazilian Portuguese; Bahian Portuguese

Language codes
- ISO 639-3: –
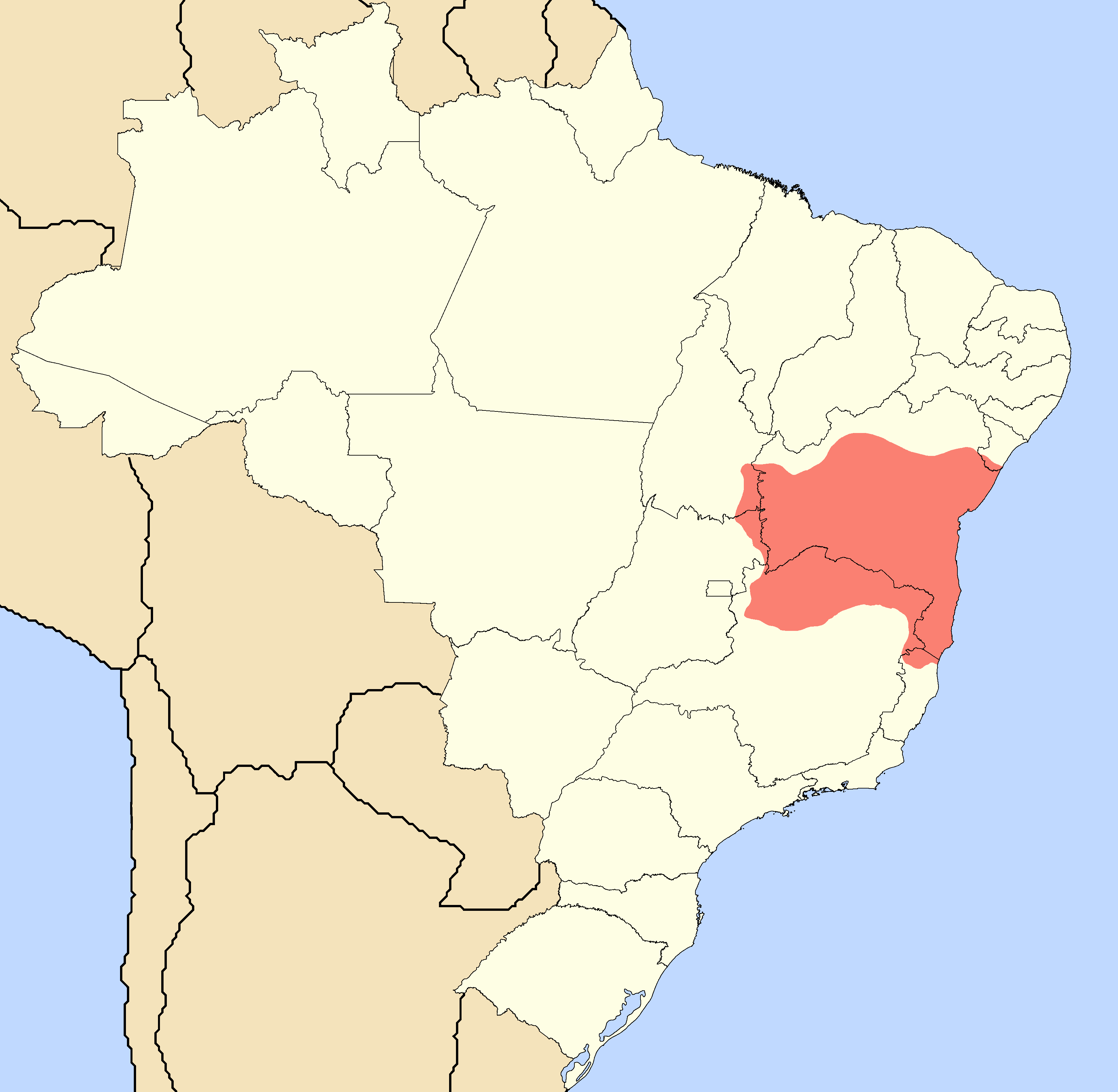
- Approximate range of the Bahian dialect over a map of Brazil

Baiano Portuguese, also known as Baianês, is a dialect of the Portuguese language spoken in most of the Brazilian state of Bahia, the south of Sergipe and the north of Minas Gerais and Espírito Santo.

The Baiano dialect is classified as a meridional Brazilian dialect, belonging to the same group as the Fluminense and Mineiro dialects, but with the presence of intermediary characteristics found in the septentrional Central Northeastern, Recifense, North Coast and Nortista dialects.

It was one of the first dialects of Portuguese to form in the Brazilian territory, being influenced by the languages of the Tupinambá, Yoruba and Bantu peoples. It formed in the city of Salvador, then capital of colonial Brazil.

The Baiano dialect is academically regarded as culturally rich, despite this, it suffers a certain degree of discrimination from Brazilian media, part of the general historical sentiment of xenophobia towards Northeastern Brazilians. The dialect is an important part of Baiano cultural identity.

== Vocabulary ==
List of words from the Baiano dialect:

Baiano Portuguese	Standard Portuguese equivalent	Meaning
Buzu	Ônibus	Bus
Mainha	Mãe	Mom
Painho	Pai	Dad
Aonde	Interjeição/onde	Interjection/where
Pão de Sal	Pão francês	Pão Francês bread
Comer água	Ingerir bebida alcoólica	Drink alcohol
Grafite	Lapiseira	Pencil case
Azeite doce	Azeite de oliva	Olive oil
Ponta de grafite	Grafite	Pencil
Lapiseira	Apontador de lápis	Pencil sharpener
Colé	E ai? Como vai?	How are you?
Aipim	Mandioca, macaxeira	Cassava
Passeio	Calçada	Sidewalk
Porreta	Bom, excelente	Good
Beiju	Tapioca	Tapioca
Retado	Bravo/muito bom	Angry/very good

== Phonology ==
=== Consonants ===
		Labial	Coronal		Dorsal		Glottal
		Labial	Alveolar	Postalveolar	Palatal	Velar	Glottal
Nasal		m	n		j̃		
Plosive	voiceless	p	t			k	(ʔ)
Plosive	voiced	b	d			ɡ	(ʔ)
Fricative	voiceless	f	s	ʃ			h
Fricative	voiced	v	z	ʒ			ɦ
Approximant					j	w	
Tap or flap			ɾ				
Lateral			l	ʎ			

/ʔ/ only occurs in word-initial position, before vowels. The Portuguese phoneme /r/ is realized glottally, as [h] or [ɦ].

==== Allophones ====
The allophones are phonemes that vary between dialects and can be perceived as so by speakers of the language. Examples of Baiano allophones include:

- /t͡ʃ / and /c/ before /i/, as in "antigamente";
- /d͡ʒ/ and /ɟ/ before /i/, as in "dígito";
- /s/, /z/, and /ʃ/ in the end of words, as in "dias";
- /s/ and /ʃ/ before voiceless consonants (c, f, k, p, q, s, t), as in "sexta";
- /l/ and /ʎ/ before /i/, as in "limão";
- /n/ and /ɲ/ before /i/, as in "animal";
- in some subdialects, such as Catingueiro (spoken by Sertanejos), /t/ and /d/ palatalize to /tʃ/ and /dʒ/ in certain environments, as in muito [ˈmũjtʃu] and doido [ˈdojdʒu].

=== Vowels ===
List of vowels:

- /a/ (a);
- /e/ (e);
- /ɛ/ (e);
- /i/ (e, i);
- /o/ (o);
- /ɔ/ (o);
- /ʊ/ (o);
- /u/ (o, u).

== Grammar ==
Baiano Portuguese omits defined articles before personal names, this allows for the differentiation between people and objects/animals, as adding articles to personal names sounds unnatural and dehumanizing to Baiano speakers (e.g. "Maria foi à/na/pra feira" instead of "A Maria foi à/na/pra feira"). Baiano inverts the negative particle in phrases (e.g. "Sei não" instead of "Não sei"), this characteristic is also found in the Central Northeastern and North Coast dialects.

== Subdialects ==
Baiano has 3 subdialects.

- Soteropolitano, spoken by Baianos in the Recôncavo Baiano region, including the Salvador metropolitan zone.
- Catingueiro, spoken by the Sertanejos of the Sertão of Bahia (with exception of the north of the state). This subdialect has many characteristics present in the Central Northeastern dialect, such as the use of /tʃ/ and /c/ instead of /t/ in some words, such as "muito", "respeito" and "oito", which become "muntcho", "respetcho" and "otcho", while the letter "d" in words such as "NecessidaDe" and "IdaDe" becomes a /d/, as opposite to the palatalized /dʒ/ of the coastal subdialects.
- Southern Coast, spoken in the coastal areas of Bahia (south of Salvador) and the north of Espírito Santo. It is similar to Soteropolitano.
