= Adelino =

Adelino may refer to:

== People ==
- Adelino (given name)
- Adelino (footballer, born 1921), Brazilian football midfielder
- Adelino (footballer, born 1994), Brazilian football striker

== Places ==
- Adelino, New Mexico, American census-designated place
- Tome-Adelino, New Mexico, American former census-designated place
- Estádio Adelino Ribeiro Novo, Portuguese football stadium for Gil Vicente
- Campo do Adelino Rodrigues, Portuguese football stadium for C.F. União

== See also ==
- Adelinów, Polish settlement
