= Cearense =

Cearense may refer to:

- The demonym of Ceará, Brazil
- Dudu Cearense Brazilian footballer from Ceará
- Associação de Basquete Cearense, a basketball club based in Fortaleza
- Campeonato Cearense, Ceará state football top division
- Cearense dialect, Portuguese spoken in Ceará
