= Matuto people =

Povo Matuto
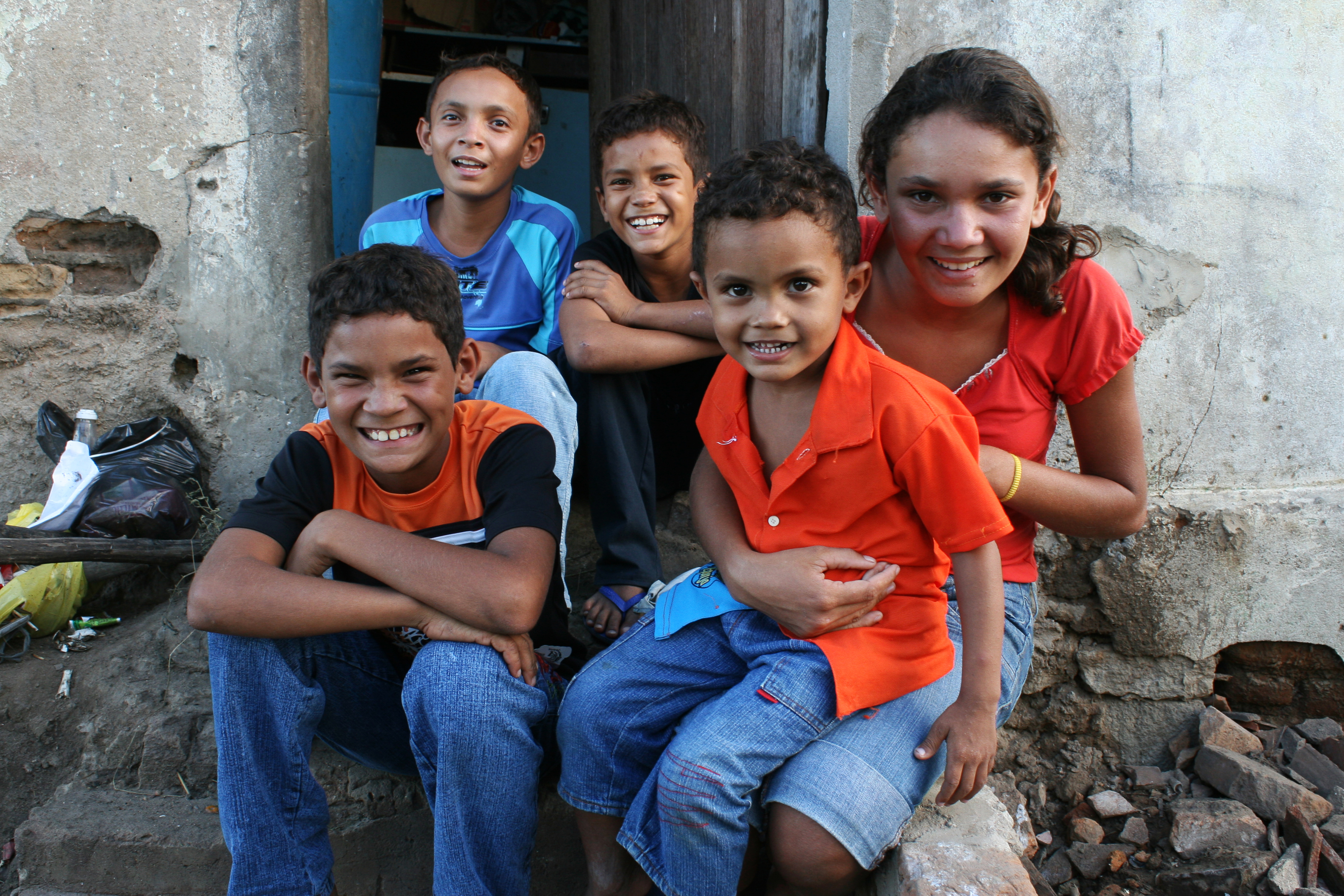
- Matuto children in Timbaúba, Pernambuco

Total population
- c. 11-13 million (2022)

Languages
- Portuguese language, Central Northeastern and Recifense dialects

Religion
- Roman Catholicism and Protestantism

Related ethnic groups
- Sertanejos, Baianos, Portuguese, Bantus, Tupinambás

The Matutos (Natively: [mɐˈtutu]), also known as Nordestinos Litorâneos, Nordestinos da Zona da Mata or Crioulos are a Brazilian ethnocultural group distributed across the Zona da Mata subregion of the northeastern Brazilian states of Rio Grande do Norte, Paraíba, Pernambuco, Alagoas, Sergipe and the extreme north of Bahia; they are speakers of the Central Northeastern and Recifense dialects of Portuguese.

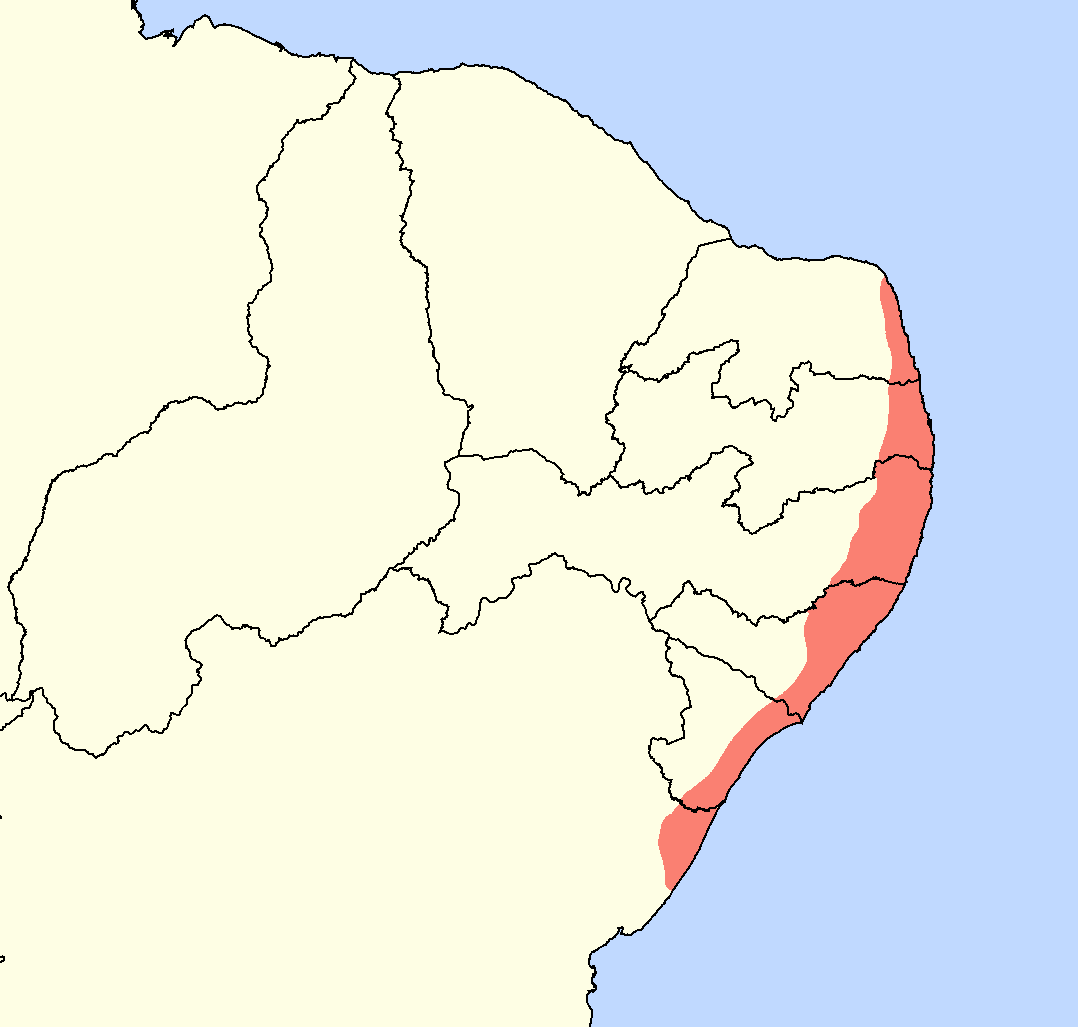
Area inhabited by the Matutos (red) over a map of northeastern Brazil

== History ==
The Matuto people originated from the genetic mixture and cultural amalgamation that occurred in the northeastern coast of colonial Brazil between the Portuguese settlers, the local Tupi-speaking Amerindian peoples and enslaved Africans of several Bantu and Niger-Congo ethnic groups that were brought to the region via the transatlantic slave trade.

The economic activity in the region was initially based on the extraction of Pau-Brazil wood for use in dyes and pigmentations in Europe, however, the depletion of this resource led the Portuguese to move away from extraction and into agriculture, beginning to cultivate sugarcane, as the local climate and soil was found to be highly efficient and able to hold multiple planting cycles of the crop in a year. The unequal land distribution caused by the use of the hereditary captaincies system by the Portuguese crown and the authorization of using enslaved labour in the colony led to a few families owning vast swaths of land in the region, while non land-owning whites stayed beneath in the social pyramid, with natives and Africans forming the lowest classes.

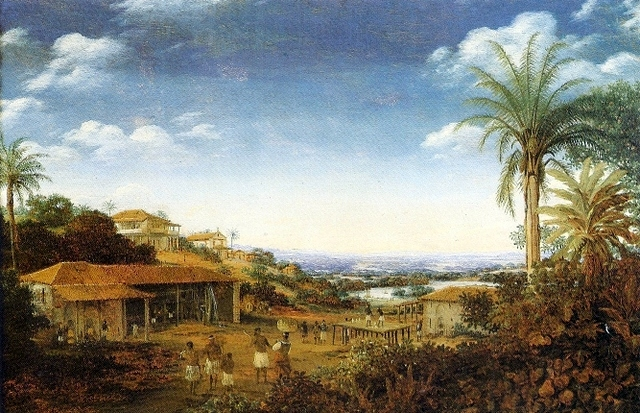
Engenho de Pernambuco, by Frans Post. This 17th century painting depicts a sugarcane plantation in coastal Pernambuco.

Since sugarcane was very profitable, these families maintained the region's economy under a regime of monoculture cultivation of the crop. The culture of the region would then be molded around the coastal fisherman, urban Recife and rural plantation lifestyles, as well as the adaptation of the European settlers to life in the new world and the local humid tropical climate, while the drier climate and economy based on animal husbandry and staple crops of the sertão and agreste led to a cultural differentiation between its settlers and the inhabitants of the Zona da Mata, leading to the formation of the Matuto people in the eastern coast and the Sertanejos inland. To this day, land distribution in the Matuto heartland is still very unequal, and sugarcane remains as the main crop planted in the area, although commerce, tourism and logging have grown in recent decades.

In the 17th century parts of the northeastern region of Brazil were taken by the Dutch, who established their own colony in the region, replacing the Portuguese administration. Although they theorically controlled both the coast and the caatinga, Dutch power and influence was mostly limited to the coastal areas of Pernambuco and Paraíba, especially in Recife and Olinda.

== Culture ==
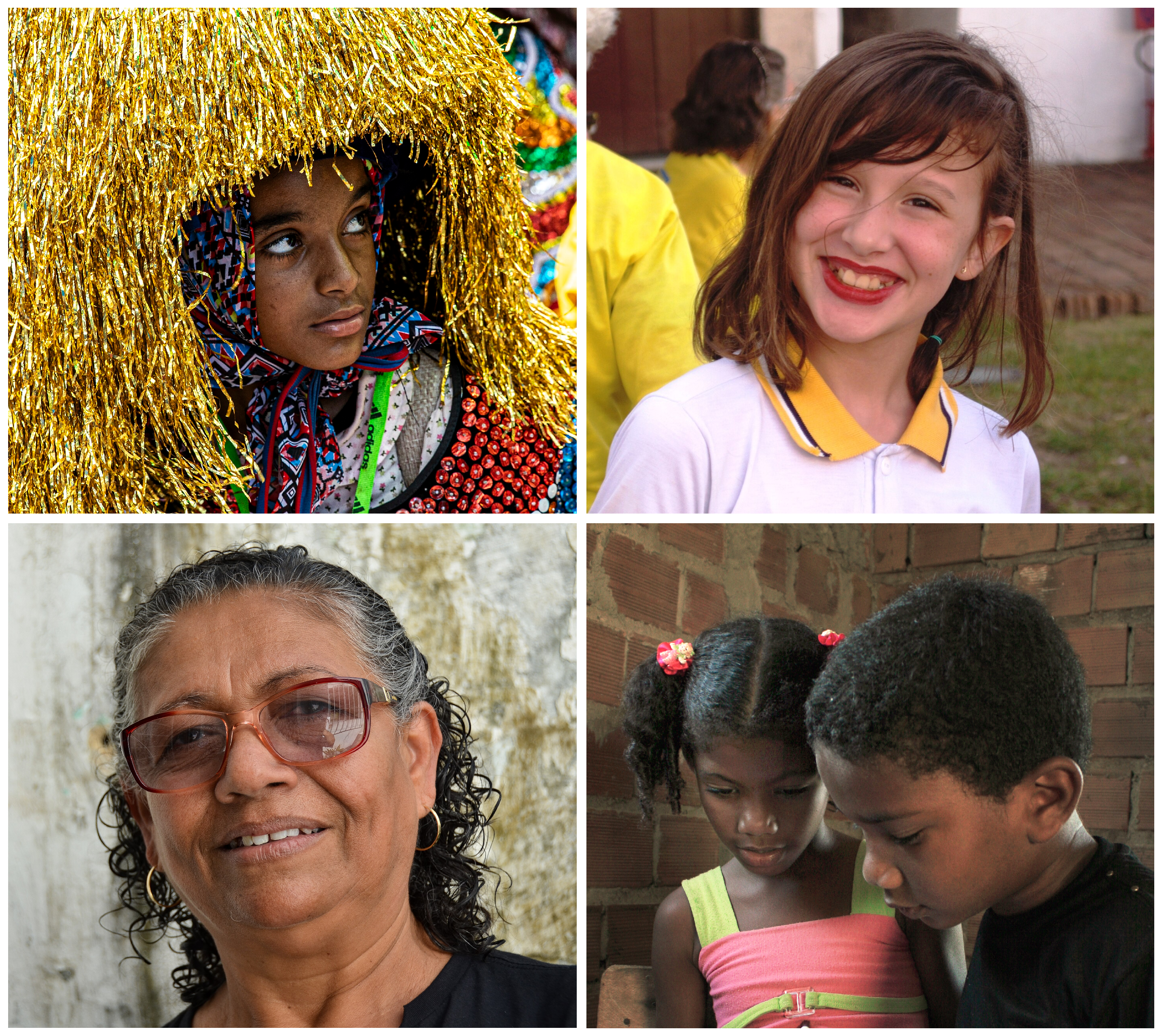
Matutos from the Greater Recife region.

The culture of the Matuto people has more influence of African sources than that of the Sertanejos that live in the Sertão subregion, much due to the higher proportion of enslaved peoples in the coast, although the Matutos and the Sertanejos are related ethnocultural groups and share more similarities with each other than with the rest of the Brazilian cultures. Matutos also received considerable cultural influences from groups such as the Dutch and the Sephardic Jews, especially in the Greater Recife region and the east of Pernambuco, mainly through architecture, education, science and commerce.

The traditional food of the Matutos is greatly influenced by the historical context and geography of the region, being way more focused on seafood and fishes due to the proximity to the sea and on sugary sweets due to the influence of sugarcane. Matuto dishes include Caranguejada, Moqueca, cooked peanuts, Guaiamum, Queijada, Malcasado, Sururu, Chiclete de Camarão, Pituzada, Massunim, Peixada, Pirão, Cartola, Bolo de Rolo, Caldinho, Arrumadinho, Chambaril, Rubacão, Nego Bom and Rapadura.

Cultural festivities and traditions of the Matuto people include Lambe Sujo, the Frevo dance, Festa de Bom Jesus dos Navegantes, Caboclinhos, Festa do Mastro, Coco de Roda, Bumba Meu Boi, Guerreiro, Maracatu, Galo da Madrugada, Bonecos de Olinda and Carnaval, with the Matuto version of Carnaval being more similar to the original European festivity than the one of Rio de Janeiro.

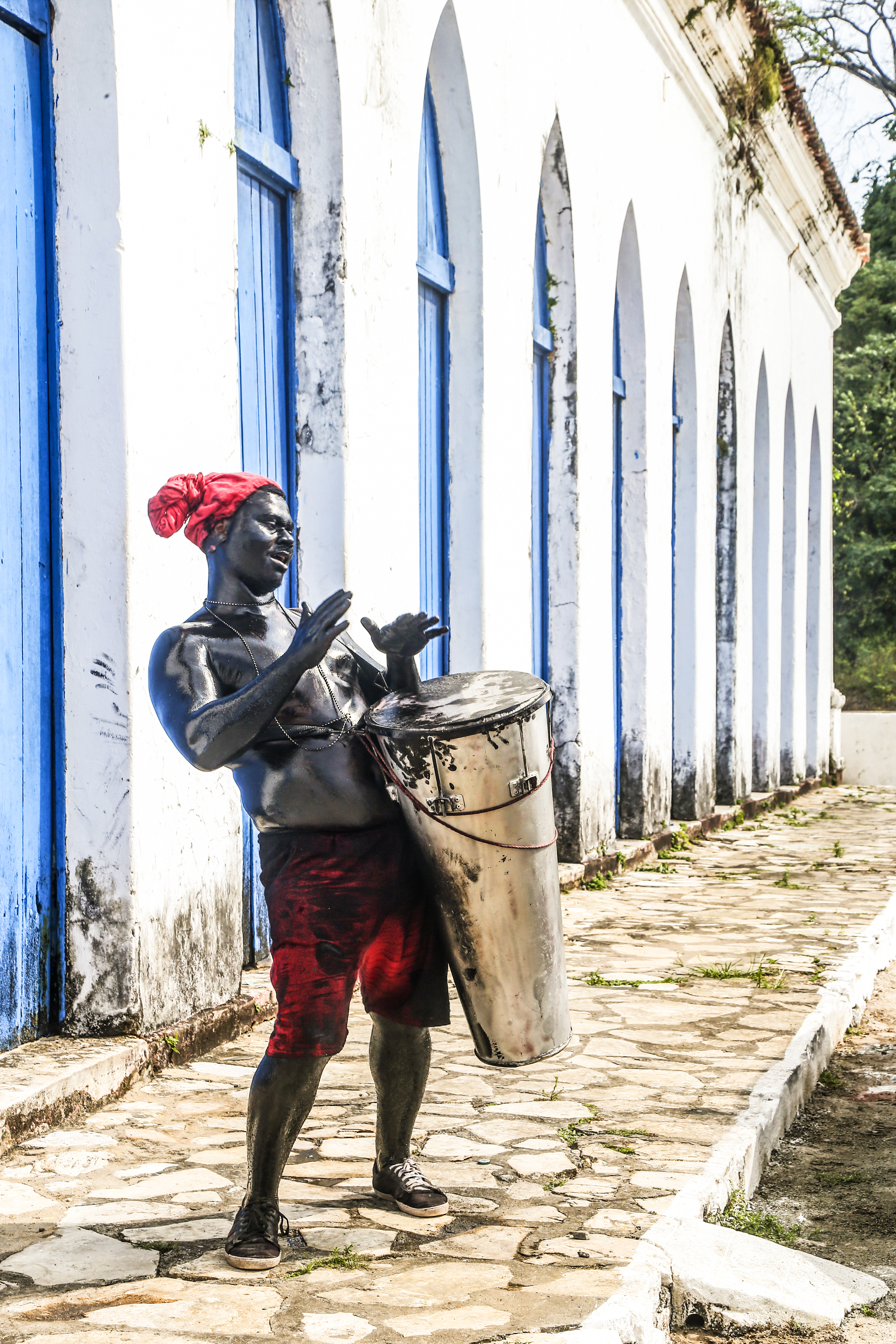
Traditional Lambe Sujo body paint in Laranjeiras, Sergipe.

Most Matutos speak the Central Northeastern dialect of Brazilian Portuguese, although their version of it is less distinct from the rest of the Brazilian dialects than the one spoken by the Sertanejo people further inland; much due to the influence from the mediatic Paulistano and Carioca dialects of southeastern Brazil, introduced to the region through radio and television beginning in the 1940s. Matutos of the Recife metropolitan zone speak the Recifense dialect.

== Genetics ==
According to the 2022 census 55 to 60% of the population of the Matuto heartland self-identified as pardo, 25 to 30% as white and 10 to 15% as black. Overall, the vast majority of Matutos are mixed to some degree, with varying rates of European, African or Amerindian ancestry. A 2019 systematic scoping review of 51 studies analyzed the autosomal DNA composition of Brazilians from several states and cities and put the average ancestral component of people from the city of Recife as being 60% European, 23% African and 17% Amerindian; and those from Maceió as 67% European, 19% African and 14% Amerindian.

== Notable Matutos ==
- Juninho Pernambucano - footballer
- Deodoro da Fonseca - 1st president of Brazil
- Rivaldo - footballer
- Graciliano Ramos - writer
- Maguila - boxer
- Paulo Freire - writer and educator
- José Lins do Rego - writer and novelist
- Clarice Lispector - writer
- Floriano Peixoto - 2nd president of Brazil
- Pepe - footballer
- Joaquim Nabuco - writer
- Oscar Schmidt - basketball player
- Zagallo - footballer
- Manuel Bandeira - writer
- Café Filho - 18th president of Brazil
- Romero Britto - painter and sculptor
- Chacrinha - comedian and television presenter
- Djavan - singer
- Douglas Santos - footballer
- Pedro de Calasans - writer
- Câmara Cascudo - anthropologist
- Pedro de Araújo Lima - politician
- Roberto Firmino - footballer
- Renan Calheiros - politician
- Reginaldo Rossi - singer
