= Central northeastern Portuguese =

Brazilian Portuguese variety

- Dialeto nordestino central
- Pronunciation: Portuguese pronunciation: [diaˈlɛtu nɔʁdɛsˈtĩnu sẽˈtɾaw]
- Native to: Rio Grande do Norte, Paraíba, Alagoas, Sergipe, Pernambuco (except Recife metropolitan area and Zona da Mata), Ceará (South and South-Central, region also known popularly as "Cariri"), Bahia (North and North-Central, in the São Francisco River Valley), southeastern of Piauí and southwest of Maranhão
- Ethnicity: Sertanejos and Matutos
- Native speakers: c. 20-24 million (2022)
- Language family: Indo-European: Italic; Latin; Romance; Western; Ibero-Romance; West Iberian; Galician-Portuguese; Portuguese; Vernacular Brazilian; Central northeastern Portuguese

Language codes
- ISO 639-3: –
- Glottolog: None
- Linguasphere: 51-AAA-am
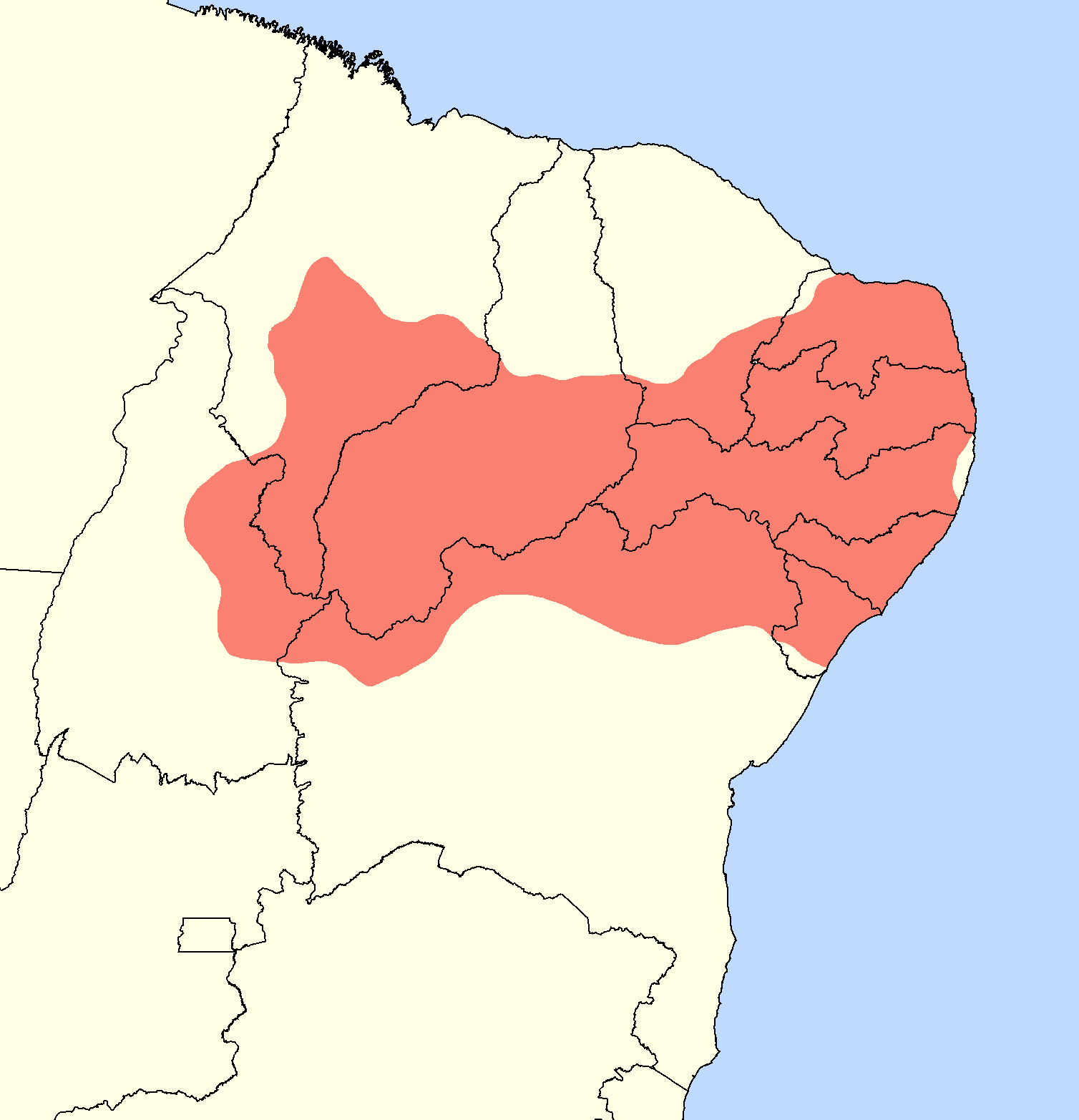
- Approximate range of the dialect over a map of northeastern Brazil.

The central northeastern dialect of Brazilian Portuguese (Portuguese: dialeto nordestino central) is a dialect spoken in the central part of the Northeast Region, Brazil, in all the states of Rio Grande do Norte, Paraíba, Alagoas and Sergipe, much of the state of Pernambuco (except for the Zona da Mata and the Recife metropolitan area), north of Bahia, south of Ceará, southeastern of Piauí and a few regions of Maranhão. This dialect shares similarities between north coast, Baiano and Recifense dialects. It is spoken by the majority of Sertanejos and Matutos, as well as some Maranhenses.

== Main features ==
- Predominant use of voiced (d) and voiceless (t) dental stops before close front unrounded vowel (i) even in final syllables "de" and "te", like presente [pɾɛˈzẽti] ("present") and diário [diˈaɾju] ("daily").
- Palatalization predominant (but not always recurring) of fricatives /s/ and /z/ in /ʃ/ and /ʒ/ before voiceless (t) and voiced (d) alveolar stops, and also, but less often, before the denti-alveolar lateral approximant (l) and the denti-alveolar nasal (n), like poste [ˈpɔʃti] ("post"), desde [ˈdeʒdi] ("from", "since"), os navios [uʒ naˈviws] ('the ships"), and dois lados [ˈdojʒ ˈladʊs] ("two sides").
- Debuccalization of syllable-final /s/ and /z/ in colloquial speech (in a number of words and with varying frequency according to the place) to the glottal fricatives [h] and [ɦ] (when in the end of words, this only happens if there's another word following it, but if it doesn't, the pronunciations of these consonants are the standard ones), like mesmo [ˈmeɦmʊ] ("same") and eu fiz tudo [ˈew ˈfih 'tudʊ] (being more common [ˈew ˈfiʃ 'tudʊ]).
- Debuccalization of the letter "v" (normally pronounced as [v]) in colloquial speech to the voiced glottal fricative [ɦ], in some of the verbal forms (those starting with "v") of the verbs "Ir" ("to go"), "Vir" ("to come") and "Ver" ("to see"), like Vamo? [ˈɦɐ̃mʊ̥] or [ˈɦɐ̃m] ("Let's go?"), Tu vem? [ˈtu ˈɦẽj̃] ("Are you coming?") and Vai te embora! [ˈɦaj ˈtĩˈbɔ(ː)ɾɐ] ("(You) Go away!").
- In "des", "dis", "tes" or "tis" syllables, there are voiced alveolar sibilant affricate (d͡z) and voiceless alveolar sibilant affricate (t͡s): idades [iˈdad͡z] ("ages", "years") and partes [ˈpaht͡s] ("parts").
- Voiced glottal fricative (ɦ) and voiceless glottal fricative (h) are present in the sound of the letter "r" (the first between syllables, but never with an "r" starting a non-initial syllable alone, because these do /ɾ/, and the second at the beginning of words or digraph "rr"). None of the two phonemes occur at the end of words. Examples: corda [ˈkɔɦdɐ] ("rope"), rabo [ˈɦabu] ("tail" - also locally in Brazilian Northeast "buttocks") and barragem [baˈɦaʒẽj̃] ("dam"), querer [keˈɾe] ("to want").
- Opening of the pre-tonic vowels /e/ and /o/ to /ɛ/ and /ɔ/ most of these syllables with vowels: rebolar [hɛbɔˈla] ("throw away").

== IPA for Central northeastern Portuguese ==
This key also serves, for the most part, to the north coast and recifense dialects. But the dialects cited here do not have the phoneme /d͡z/ and /t͡s/, characteristic of the central northeastern dialect. Recifense dialect usually palatalizes fricatives in any syllabic consonant meeting (including the end of words) and not only before /d/ and /t/.

Moreover, in certain regions of southeastern of Piauí and Maranhão west coast also a greater or lesser palatalization of fricatives may occur under the influence of Amazonian dialects (northern and Amazon Plateau), and even the absence of such palatalization. That is, in some areas the sound is alveolar (/s/ and /z/), and in others postalveolar /ʃ/ and /ʒ/.

In north coast dialect, also virtually no dental stops before /i/, /j/ or /ĩ/, and in its place they use postalveolar affricates (/d͡ʒ/ and /t͡ʃ/). In contrast, the central northeastern dialect has almost exclusive predominance of dental stops before /i/, /j/ or /ĩ/. And the postalveolar affricates are used only in the following cases: in words of foreign origin in the Portuguese language, especially English; in words denoting slang and regionalisms; and phonemes are present in the standard variety of Brazilian Portuguese, are also often in television media to replace the dental stops (though never in common parlance).

=== Consonants ===
| IPA | Graphemes | Examples | English approximation |
|---|---|---|---|
| b | b | bucho [ˈbuʃu], bloco [ˈblɔku], bruto [ˈbɾutu] | best |
| d | d | dar [ˈda], depósito [dɛˈpɔzitu] | down |
| d ^{1} | d | dia [ˈdiɐ], açude [aˈsudi] | dear, dream |
| d͡z ^{2} | des, dis | idades [iˈdad͡z] | roughly like: minds |
| f | f | feio [ˈfeju] | family |
| g | g, gu | galinha [ɡaˈlĩȷ̃ɐ], guisado [ɡiˈzadu] | get |
| ɦ ^{3} | r | rei [ˈɦej], corda [ˈkɔɦdɐ], marmota [maɦˈmɔtɐ] | behind |
| h ^{4} | r, rr | arte [ˈahti], cartão [kahˈtɐ̃w] | hot, high |
| ʒ ^{5} | g, j, s, z | jumento [ʒuˈmẽtu], gente [ˈʒẽti], desde [ˈdeʒdi] | rouge |
| k | c, qu | caju [kaˈʒu], querer [keˈɾe] | keep, call |
| l | l | lombo [ˈlõbu] | let |
| ɫ ^{7} | l | ligar [ɫiˈɡa], lindo [ˈɫĩdu] | feeling |
| ʎ | lh, li | filho [ˈfiʎu], família [fɐˈmiʎɐ] | roughly like: million |
| m | m | macho [ˈmaʃu] | environment |
| n | n | neto [ˈnɛtu] | sonic |
| ɲ ~ ȷ̃ | nh, ni | farinha [faˈɾĩȷ̃ɐ], alumínio [aluˈmĩɲu] | roughly like: canyon |
| p | p | poço [ˈposu] | peace |
| ɾ | r | arengar [aɾẽˈɡa], comprar [kõˈpɾa] | ladder in American English |
| s | c, ç, s, xc, z | sebo [ˈsebu], pensa [ˈpẽsɐ], caça [ˈkasɐ], exceção [ɛsɛˈsɐ̃w̃], cearense [sɪaˈɾẽsi], rapaz [haˈpajs] | sale |
| t | t | tamanco [tɐˈmɐ̃ku], terra [ˈtɛɦɐ] | time |
| t ^{1} | t | tia [ˈtiɐ], noite [ˈnojti] | team |
| t͡s ^{2} | tes, tis | artes [ˈaht͡s] | roughly like: saints |
| ʃ ^{8} | ch, s, x, z | caixote [ka[j]ˈʃɔti], chave [ˈʃavi], abestado [abeʃˈtadu] | shop |
| z | z | zangado [zɐ̃ˈɡadu] | zero |

- ^{1}After the vowels /i/ or /ĩ/ and semivowel /j/.
- ^{2}Used in plural words ending in "des", "dis", "tes" and "tis".
- ^{3}Between the end and the beginning of syllables.
- ^{4}At the beginning of words and the digraph "rr".
- ^{5}Also in palatalization of /z/ before /d/.
- ^{6}Phonetic junction between /k/ and /s/.
- ^{7}Allophone of /l/ before /i/ and /ĩ/.
- ^{8}Also in palatalization of /s/ before /t/.

=== Marginal phonemes ===
| IPA | Examples | English approximation |
|---|---|---|
| dʒ ^{1} | jeans [ˈd͡ʒĩs], diabo [ˈd͡ʒabu], tédio [ˈtɛd͡ʒu] | change |
| tʃ ^{1} | tchau [ˈt͡ʃaw], capuccino [kapuˈt͡ʃĩnu], moléstia [mʊˈlɛʃt͡ʃa] | cheese |

- ^{1} Only in words of foreign origin in the Portuguese language, in words denoting slang, regionalisms and optionally the grapheme "di" and "ti" that are in post-tonic syllables with rising diphthongs (and never in all locations, depending on local state changes to state where it is spoken dialect), and phonemes are present in the standard variety of Brazilian Portuguese, are also often in television media to replace the dental stops (though never in common parlance).

=== Vowels and semivowels ===
| IPA | Graphemes | Examples | English approximation |
|---|---|---|---|
| a | a | arroz [aˈhojs] | car (GA) or time |
| ɐ | a | cama [ˈkɐ̃mɐ] | nut |
| ɐ̃ | a, am, an, ã | manhã [mɐˈj̃ɐ̃], arrumação [ahumaˈsɐ̃w], dança [ˈdɐ̃sɐ], bamba [ˈbɐ̃bɐ] | nasal /ɐ/ |
| e | e, ê | loteria [loteˈɾiɐ], glacê [ɡlaˈse] | says |
| ɛ | e, é | serra [ˈsɛhɐ], pé [ˈpɛ] | set |
| ẽ | e, em, en | pente [ˈpẽ(j)ti], exemplo [eˈzẽplu], energia [ẽnɛɦˈʒiɐ] | nasal /e/ |
| i | e, i | repentista [hɛpẽ(j̃)ˈtiʃtɐ], país [paˈiz], tarde [ˈtaɦdi] | emission or see |
| ɪ ^{1} | e | segunda [sɪˈɡũdɐ], escola [ɪsˈkɔlɐ], menino [mɪˈnĩnu] | big |
| ĩ | i, im, in | cinto [ˈsĩtu], vinho [ˈvĩɲu] | nasal /i/ |
| o | o, ô | rolinha [hoˈlĩɲɐ], sopro [ˈsopɾu], vô [ˈvo] | sole |
| ɔ | o, ó | rebolar [hɛbɔˈla] | ball or lot |
| õ | om, on, õ | arrombado [ahõˈbadu], cone [ˈkõni] | nasal /o/ |
| u | u, ú | jurubeba [ʒuɾuˈbɛbɐ], juá [ʒuˈa], | food |
| ʊ ^{1} | o | botão [bʊˈtɐ̃w̃], boneco [bʊˈnɛku] | good |
| ũ | um, un | lundu [lũˈdu], mussum [muˈsũ] | nasal /u/ |
| j | i, nh | jeito [ˈʒejtu], série [ˈsɛɾji] | you or boy |
| w | l, u | pau [ˈpaw], alto [ˈawtu], guarda [ˈɡwaɦdɐ], quase [ˈkwazi] | want or low |

- ^{1}Substitution for unstressed vowels /e/ and /o/.
