= Paulista Futebol Clube =

Paulista
- Full name: Paulista Futebol Clube
- Nickname: Galo do Japi (Japi's Rooster)
- Founded: 17 May 1909; 117 years ago
- Ground: Jayme Cintra
- Capacity: 15,155
- President: Rogério Levada
- Head coach: Oliveira
- League: Campeonato Paulista Série A3
- 2025: Paulista Série A4, 2nd of 16 (promoted)
- Website: www.paulistafutebol.com.br
Home colors	Away colors	Third colors

Paulista Futebol Clube, also called as Paulista de Jundiaí or simply Paulista, is a Brazilian football team from Jundiaí, in São Paulo, founded on 17 May 1909. They currently play in the Campeonato Paulista Série A3, the third tier of the São Paulo state league.

Home stadium is the Jayme Cintra stadium, capacity 15,000. They play in black, white and red stripes, white shorts and socks.

== History ==
In 1903, Companhia Paulista de Estradas de Ferro ("São Paulo Railroad Company") employees founded Jundiahy Football Club. In 1908, due to the lack of time of its members, Jundiahy Football Club folded. Supporters, sympathizers and players of the defunct Jundiahy founded Paulista Futebol Clube on 17 May 1909.

The team made its first participation in the Campeonato Paulista in 1926, in the amateur, LAF-organized championship. Paulista would subsequently participate in all four LAF championships, usually finishing in the lower rungs of the table, with the exception of the 1927 championship, where the team finished in third place. After that, Paulista only returned to the first level in 1969, and stayed there until its relegation in 1978.

Paulista would eventually return in 1985, only to be relegated in the following year. In 1993, with the downsizing of the first two levels, Paulista found itself relegated to the third level. In 1995, after securing promotion in the state league, Paulista, now under the name of Lousano Paulista, participated in the Campeonato Brasileiro Série C for the first time, reaching the Round of 32. After reaching this round again in the following year, the team would suffer two consecutive first round eliminations in 1997 and 1998. In 1999, the team, now sponsored by Parmalat, changed its name to Etti Jundiaí.

The club would have its period of greatest success in the early 2000s. In 2000, the team pulled a strong performance in the Copa João Havelange's Green and White Module, reaching the third stage, only missing out on qualification for the module finals in the last round, and in the next year, followed that up with the title of the Campeonato Paulista Série A2 and the title in the Série C.

In 2002, the team participated in the last Rio-São Paulo Tournament, reaching 8th place, and in the second semester, reached the semifinals of the Série B, being eliminated by Fortaleza on a 3-8 aggregate score. However, in the following three years, Paulista wouldn't top these performances, consistently failing in reaching the Second phase, but it would have better successes in the state competitions, where it reached the Finals of the 2004 Campeonato Paulista, losing to São Caetano in the finals.

In 2005, the club won the Copa do Brasil, beating Fluminense in the final. In 2006, Paulista competed in the Copa Libertadores for the first time, being eliminated in the first stage with one win three draws and two losses, with the one win being a victory over powerhouse River Plate at Estádio Jayme Cintra. In the same year, the club narrowly missed out on promotion to the Série A, tying in points with América de Natal and losing only on number of wins, having a bigger goal differential than América and third-placed Náutico.

In 2007, Paulista was relegated back to the Série C. Subsequently, the team failed in keeping itself in the Série C, after a first-phase elimination, but it continued in the Paulista first level until its relegation in 2013. The team was then relegated twice in a row between 2016 and 2017, reaching the fourth level for the first time, until being promoted back to the third level in 2019.

== Club name ==
Founded as Paulista, the team had various names in the 1990s. In 1995, the name was Lousano Paulista. In 1999, with the support of Parmalat, the name of the team was Etti Jundiaí, since Paulista is the name of a Parmalat competitor. In 2002, the team lost the support of Parmalat and the name of the team became just Jundiaí. In 2003, the team name was changed back to Paulista Futebol Clube.

Name	Period
Jundiahy Foot Ball Club	1903–1908
Paulista Futebol Clube	1909–1990
Lousano Paulista Futebol Clube	1990–1998
Etti Jundiaí Futebol	1998–2002
Paulista Futebol Clube	2002–Present

== Honours ==
=== Official tournaments ===
National
Competitions	Titles	Seasons
Copa do Brasil	1	2005
Campeonato Brasileiro Série C	1	2001
State
Competitions	Titles	Seasons
Copa Paulista	3^{s}	1999, 2010, 2011
Campeonato Paulista Série A2	4	1919, 1921, 1968, 2001
Campeonato Paulista Série A4	1	2019
Campeonato Paulista Segunda Divisão	1^{s}	2024

- record
- ^{s} shared record

=== Others tournaments ===
==== State ====
- Torneio José Ermírio de Moraes Filho (1): 1969
- Torneio Incentivo (1): 1978

=== Runners-up ===
- Campeonato Paulista (1): 2004
- Copa Paulista (1): 2009
- Campeonato Paulista Série A2 (4): 1930, 1956, 1984, 2000
- Campeonato Paulista Série A3 (2): 1960, 1995
- Campeonato Paulista Série A4 (1): 2025

=== Youth team ===
- Copa São Paulo de Futebol Júnior (1): 1997

== Stadium ==
Paulista's stadium is Estádio Jayme Cintra, inaugurated in 1957, with a maximum capacity of 15,000 people.

== Squad ==
Note: Flags indicate national team as defined under FIFA eligibility rules; some limited exceptions apply. Players may hold more than one non-FIFA nationality.

No.	Pos.	Nation	Player
—	GK	BRA	Vinícius
—	DF	BRA	Rodrigo Sabiá (on loan from Grêmio)
—	DF	BRA	Diogo
—	DF	BRA	Marcelo Xavier
—	DF	BRA	Guigov
—	DF	BRA	Eli Oséias
—	DF	BRA	Anderson Barros
—	DF	BRA	Diego Branca

No.	Pos.	Nation	Player
—	MF	BRA	Bruno Octávio
—	MF	BRA	Fábio Gomes
—	MF	BRA	Fabrizzyo
—	MF	BRA	Danilo Baia
—	MF	BRA	Wellington
—	MF	BRA	Bodini
—	MF	BRA	Heberty
—	MF	BRA	Dener
—	FW	BRA	Carlão
—	FW	BRA	Mike
—	FW	BRA	Jorge Lopes
—	FW	BRA	Maurício
—	FW	BRA	Adelino

== 2005 Copa do Brasil ==
Paulista won the Copa do Brasil 2005, playing the following matches:

Stage	Match	1st Leg	2nd Leg
First Round	Paulista - Juventude	1-0	1-1
Second Round	Paulista - Botafogo	1-1	2-2
Third Round	Internacional - Paulista	1-0	0-1 (2-4 pens)
Quarter-Finals	Figueirense - Paulista	1-0	0-1 (1-3 pens)
Semi-Finals	Paulista - Cruzeiro	3-1	2-3
Final	Paulista - Fluminense	2-0	0-0
