= Lambe Sujo =

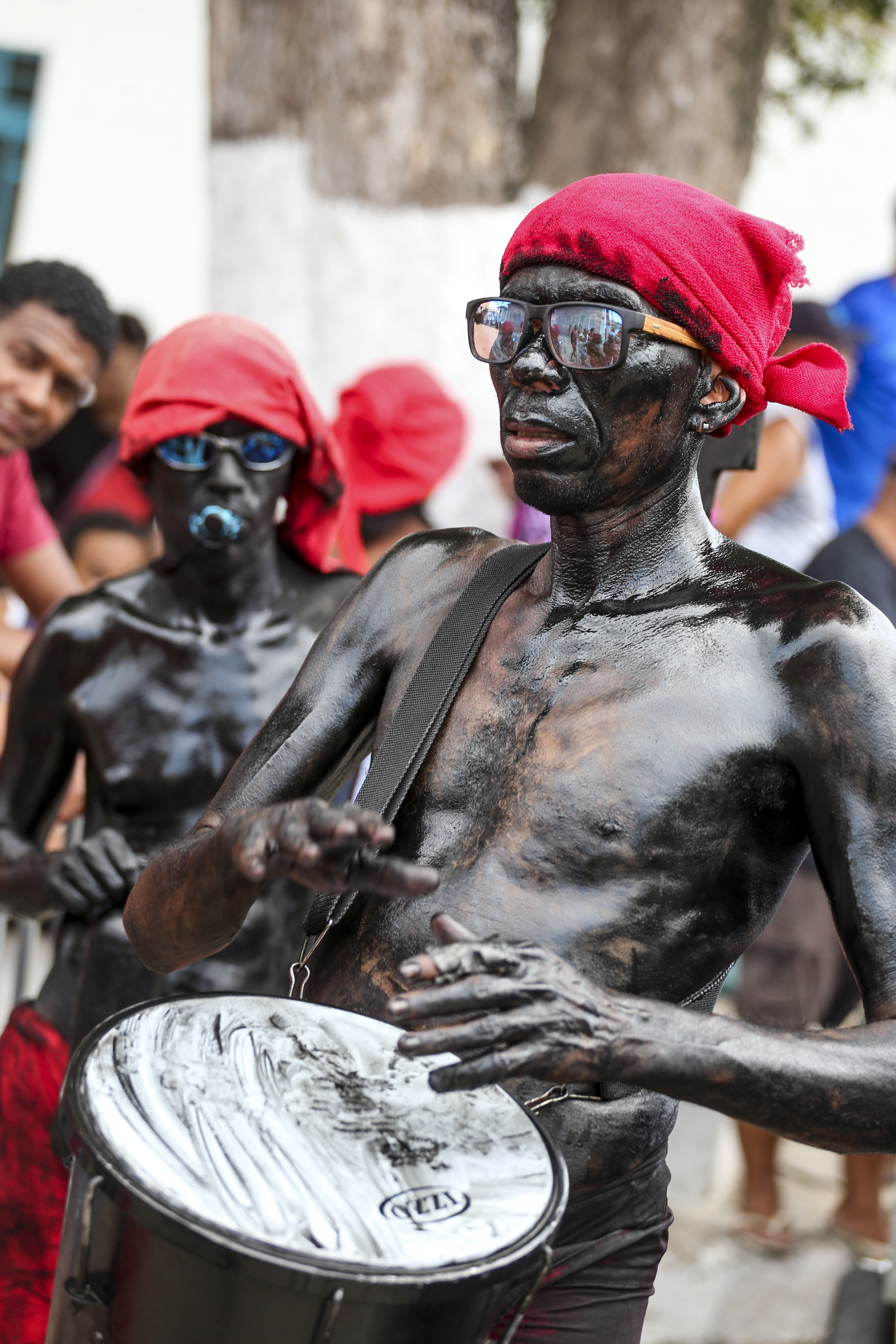
- People participating in the Lambe Sujo of Laranjeiras, Sergipe.
- Status: Active
- Genre: Cultural tradition
- Date: Second sunday of October
- Frequency: Annually
- Locations: Laranjeiras, Aracaju, Maceió, Marechal Deodoro
- Country: Brazil
- Inaugurated: 1860s

Lambe Sujo (Central northeastern Portuguese pronunciation: [ˈlãbi ˈsuʒu]) is a traditional festivity from the Zona da Mata sub-region of the Brazilian states of Alagoas and Sergipe, being practiced by the local Coastal Northeastern Brazilian people. People participating in the tradition paint their faces and bodies with coal-based pitch black paint with the objective of simulating the appearance of enslaved black people, wearing red shorts and bonnets, holding wooden sickles. During the festivity, the people painted in black fight against Caboclinhos, participants in red body paint that simulates the appearance of Tupi Amerindians.

== History ==
The modern form of the tradition is believed to have originated in the 1860s, having expanded out of the original black community after the abolishment of slavery in Brazil, which took place in 1888. The earliest surviving record of the festivity dates to newspapers from 1930.

== Gallery ==
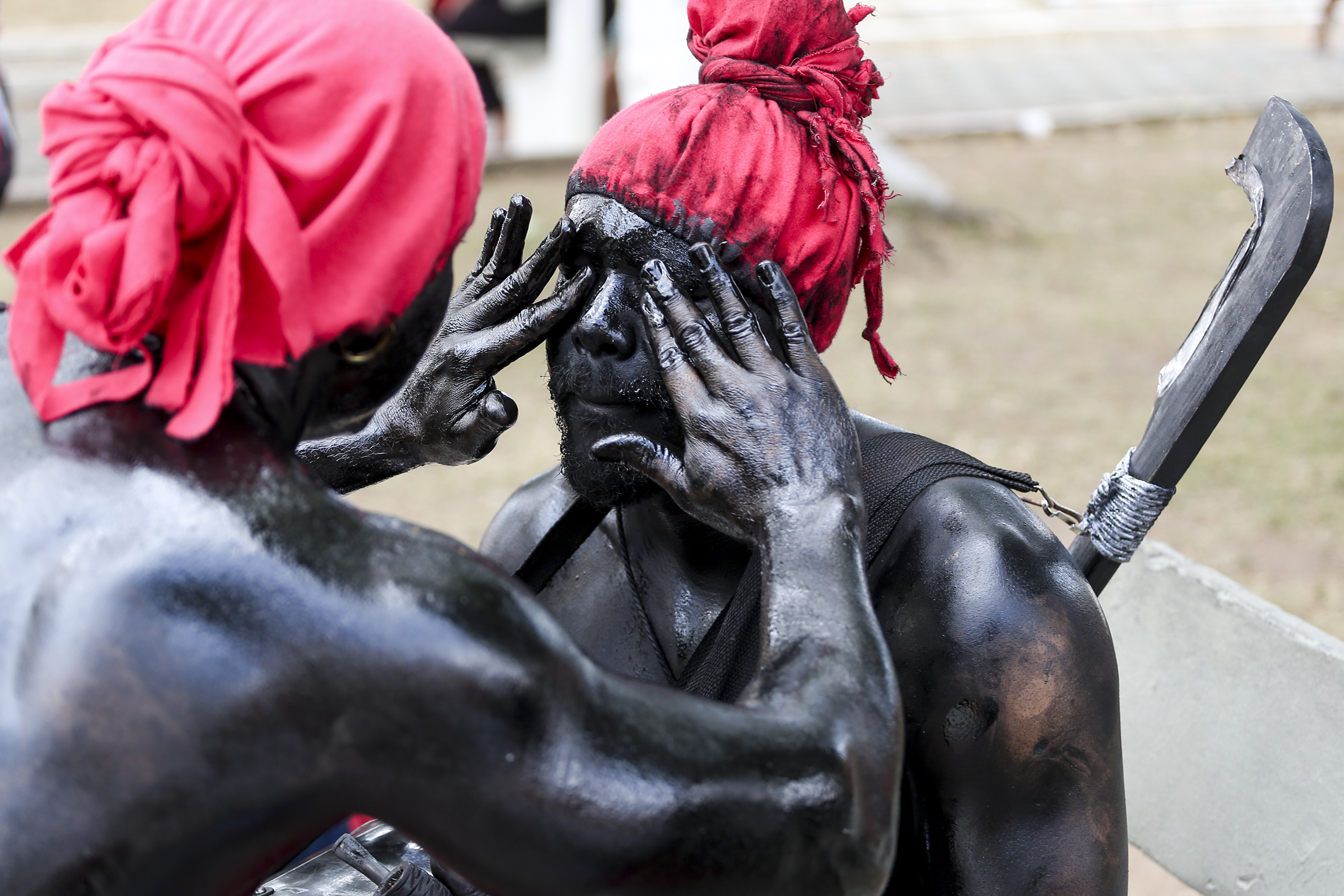
Body painting process

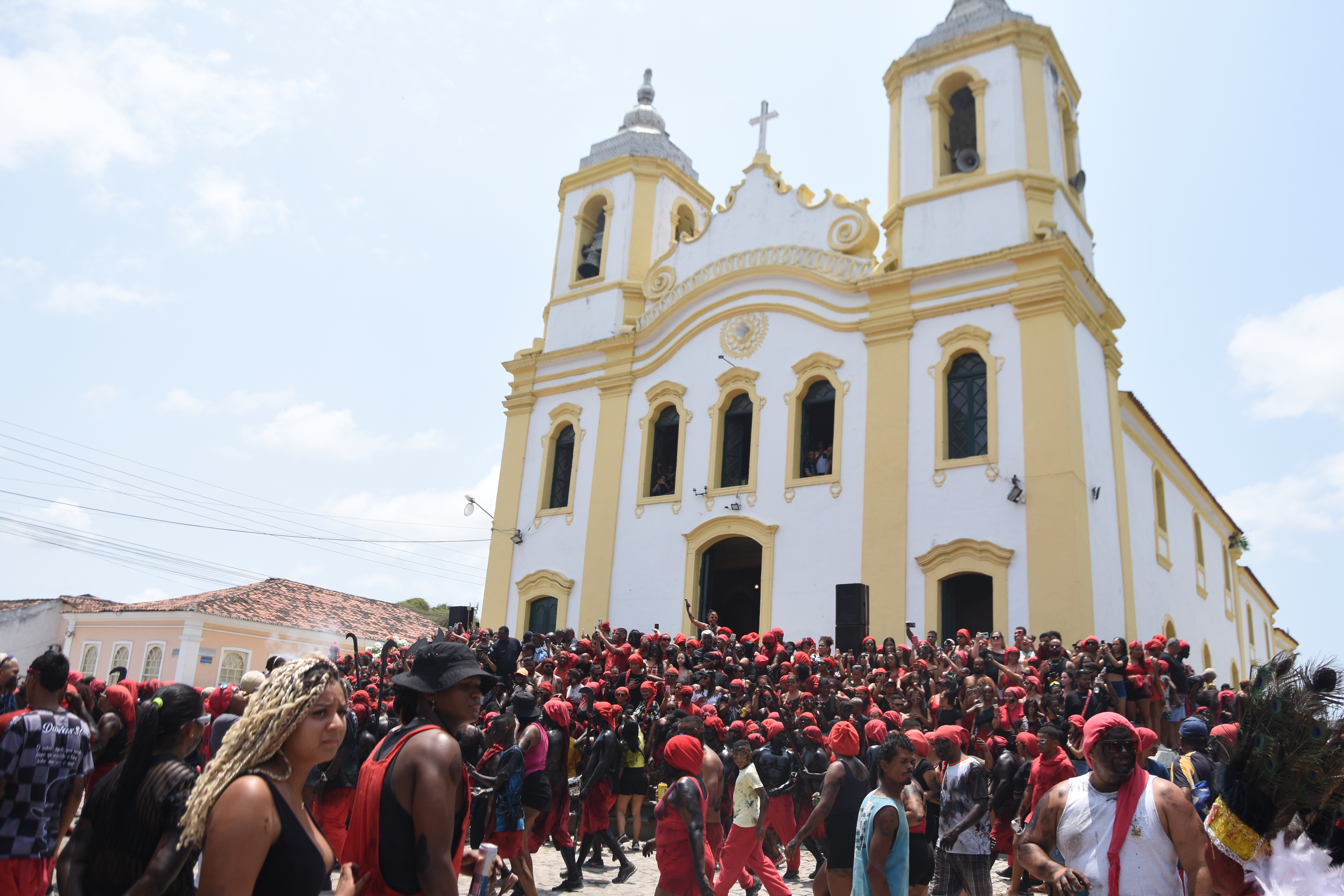
Participants meet in front of a church

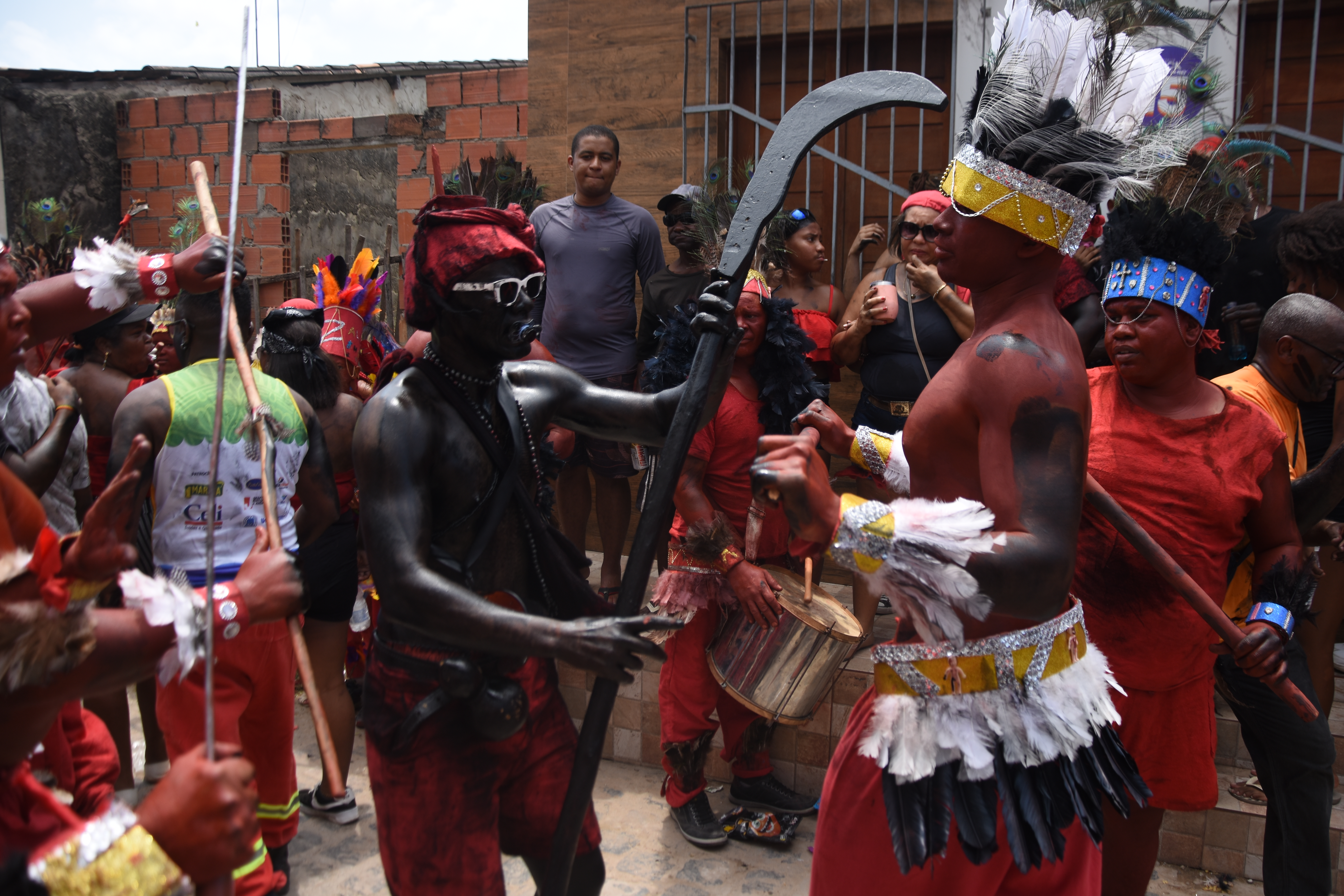
Lambe Sujo meets a rival Caboclinho

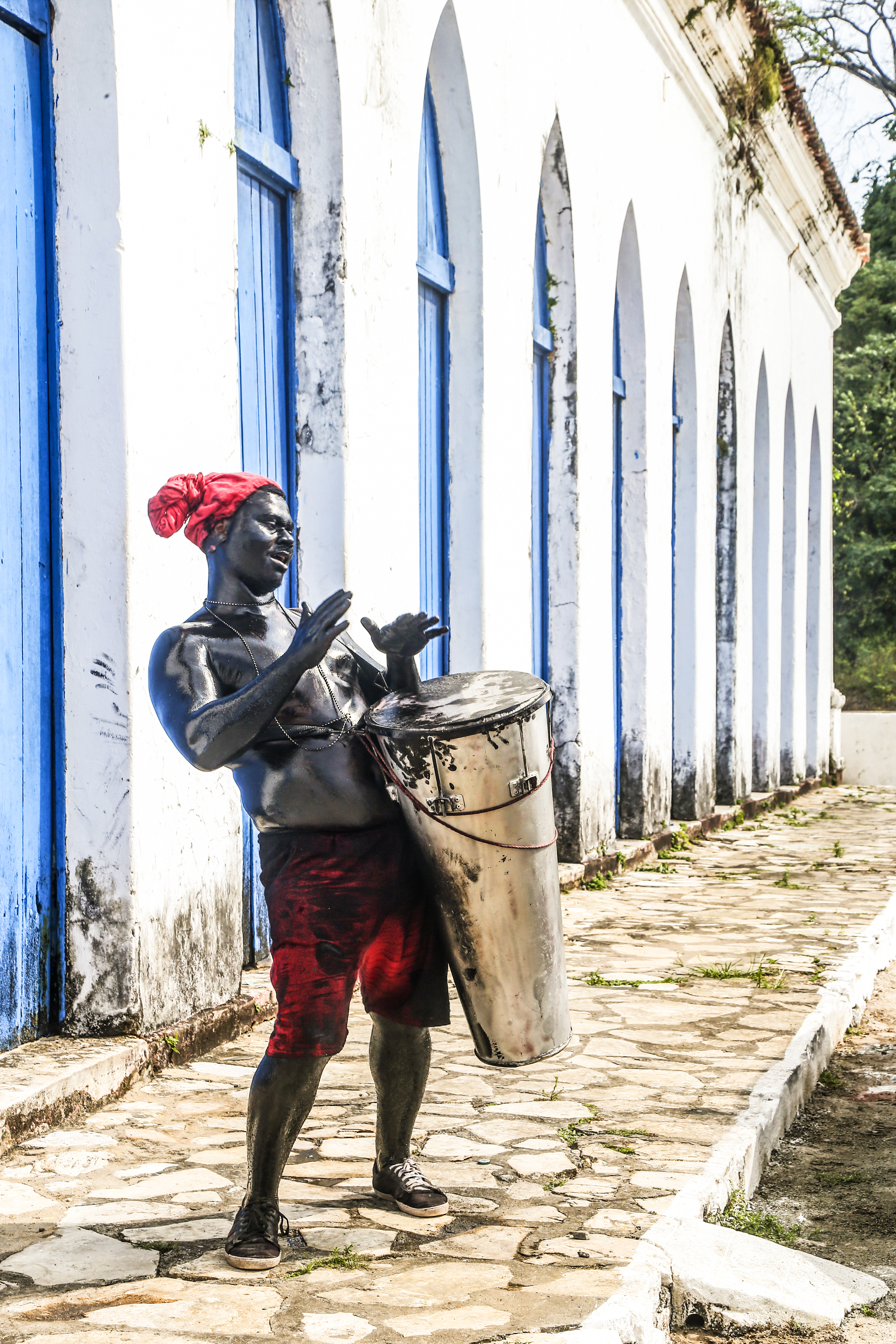
Participant playing a drum
