= Fabrizzyo =

Brazilian footballer (born 1989)

Personal information
- Full name: Fabrizzyo César Alves de Azevedo
- Date of birth: 10 January 1989 (age 37)
- Place of birth: Santa Rita, Brazil
- Height: 1.83 m (6 ft 0 in)
- Position: Midfielder

Team information
- Current team: Paulista

Senior career*
Years	Team	Apps	(Gls)
2008–	Paulista		
2011	→ Lausanne-Sport (loan)	5	(1)
- * Club domestic league appearances and goals as of 9 January 2012

Fabrizzyo César Alves de Azevedo, better known simply as Fabrizzyo (born 10 January 1989) is a retired Brazilian footballer. Last played for Paulista Futebol Clube.

After taking out a loan from Paulista in his native Brazil, he made his debut and scored for Lausanne-Sport on 16 March 2011 against Nyon in a league match. He later returned to Paulista at the end of the season. Fabrizzyo retired later that year.
