= Adelino (footballer, born 1921) =

Brazilian footballer

Personal information
- Full name: Adelino Gonçalves Torres
- Date of birth: 17 February 1921
- Place of birth: Pedro Leopoldo, Brazil
- Date of death: 7 December 1978 (aged 57)
- Place of death: Belo Horizonte, Brazil
- Position: Midfielder

Youth career
- Industrial

Senior career*
Years	Team	Apps	(Gls)
1943–1958	Cruzeiro	430	(2)
- * Club domestic league appearances and goals

Adelino Gonçalves Torres (17 February 1921 – 7 December 1978), simply known as Adelino, was a Brazilian professional footballer who played as midfielder.

== Career ==
Adelino began his career at Industrial de Pedro Leopoldo. In 1943, he enlisted in the Brazilian Expeditionary Force and started playing in matches between military personnel in Belo Horizonte. His performance caught the attention of Cruzeiro, and he was invited to join their team. In 1944, he was sent to the Italian campaign with the 12th Infantry Battalion, participating in famous battles such as Monte Castello, Montese, and Montecatini. He claimed to have killed numerous enemy soldiers and was nearly killed after a grenade exploded a few meters from him, being sent to the medical supply line in Livorno after the incident.

Upon returning, he continued his career as a footballer, making 430 appearances for Cruzeiro EC, playing until 1958 and becoming one of the athletes inducted into the club's hall of fame in 2012. After retiring, he continued working on Cruzeiro's permanent staff and was responsible for bringing Dirceu Lopes to the club in 1963.

== Honours ==
Cruzeiro

- Campeonato Mineiro: 1943, 1945, 1956

== Death ==
Adelino died in Belo Horizonte on 7 December 1978, at age of 57.
