= Recifense Portuguese =

- Dialeto Recifense
- Pronunciation: /diɐˈlɛtŭ hɛsiˈfẽsi/
- Native to: Brazil
- Region: Pernambuco
- Ethnicity: Matutos
- Native speakers: c. 3 million (2022)
- Language family: Indo-European: Italic; Latin; Romance; Western; Ibero-Romance; West Iberian; Galician-Portuguese; Portuguese; Vernacular Brazilian; Recifense Portuguese

Language codes
- ISO 639-3: None (mis)
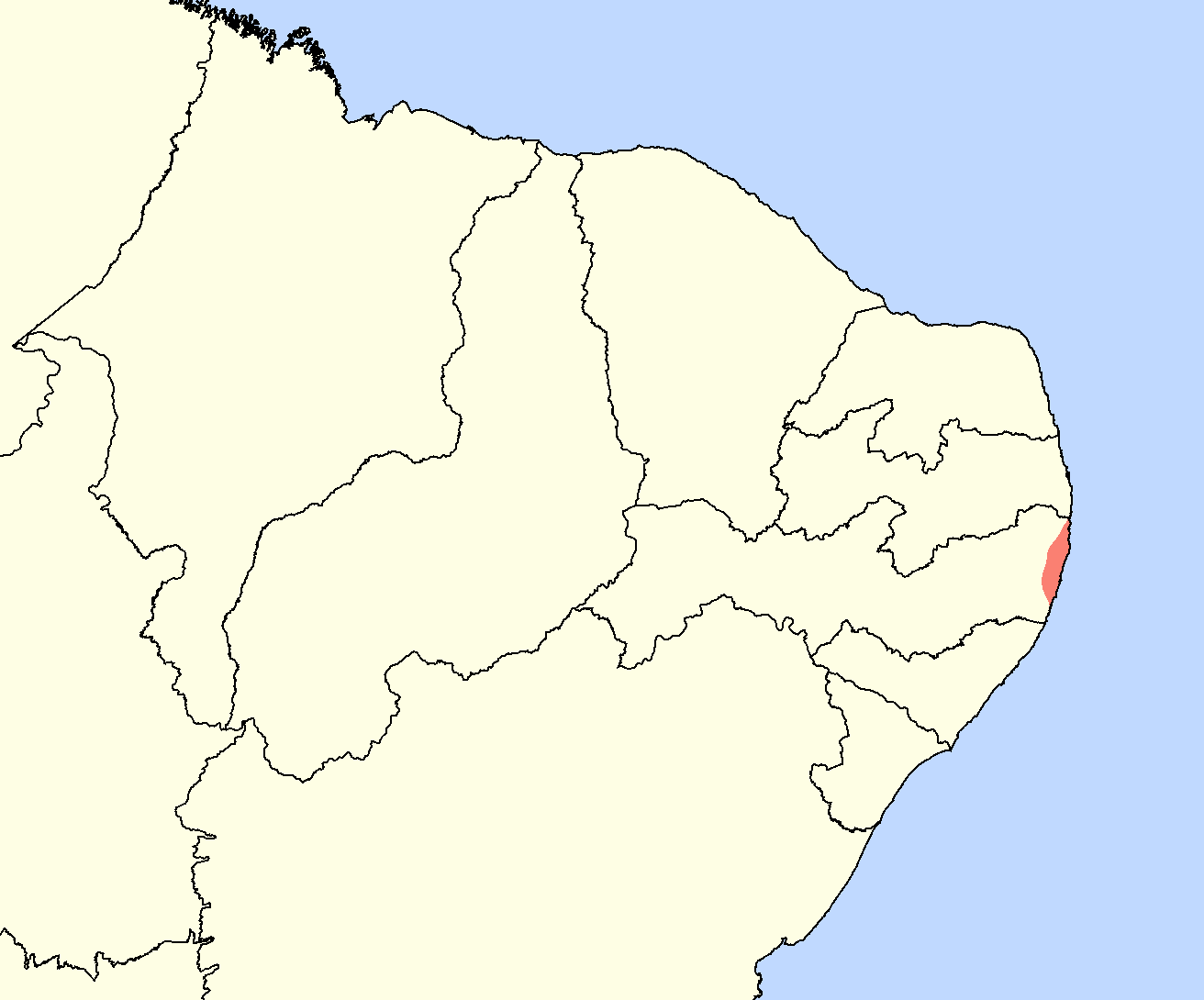
- Approximate range of the dialect (red) over a map of Northeastern Brazil.

Recifense Portuguese, also known as Mateiro Portuguese, is a dialect of the Portuguese language spoken in the metropolitan region of Recife, in the east of the Brazilian state of Pernambuco.

== Characteristics ==
Characteristics of the Recifense dialect include:

- Palatalization of /s/ and /z/ into /ʃ/ and /ʒ/ when present in the end of syllables.
- Lack of affricative pronunciation of /d/ and /t/ into /dʒ/ and /tʃ/ when preceded by /i/, which is present in other Brazilian Portuguese dialects.
- Monophthongization of words with /w/. (eg: /ˈhowpɐ/ becomes /ˈhopɐ/)
- Presence of prothesis. (eg: /ʒũˈtɐ/ becomes /ɐʒũˈtɐ/)
- Presence of hyperthesis. (eg: /sɛˈɾɔlɐ/ becomes /siˈlɔɾɐ/)
- Presence of syncope. (eg: /ˈʃikɐɾɐ/ becomes /ˈʃikɾɐ/)
- Presence of apocope. (eg: /hiˈdikulu/ becomes /hiˈdikŭ/)
- Presence of epenthesis. (eg: /kutuˈviɐ/ becomes /kutɾuˈviɐ/)
- No pronunciation of /ɾ/ in the end of words, /koɾ/ becomes /ko/.
- No pronunciation of /w/ in the end of words, /lẽˈsɔw/ becomes /lẽˈsɔ/.
- Preferred use of the word "tu" rather than "você", both meaning "you".
- Conjugation in the past perfect indicative is formed using what would be the imperfect subjunctive. (eg: "tu visse" instead of "tu viu" or "você viu")
- Palatalization of /s/ when it comes between /e/, /i/, /ɛ/ and /d/ or /t/.
- Different vocabulary, with the presence of words such as oxente, visse, oxe, boy, among others, most of which are shared with the central northeastern dialect.
