= Adelino (footballer, born 1994) =

Brazilian footballer

Personal information
- Full name: Adelino da Silva Pereira Cirqueira
- Date of birth: 6 July 1994 (age 32)
- Place of birth: Atibaia, Brazil
- Height: 1.85 m (6 ft 1 in)
- Position: Forward

Youth career
- 2011–2012: Guarani
- 2012–2014: São Paulo

Senior career*
Years	Team	Apps	(Gls)
2012	Guarani	1	(0)
2013–2017	São Paulo	1	(0)
2014	→ Noroeste (loan)	7	(0)
2014–2015	→ Portimonense (loan)	14	(0)
2016	→ Batatais (loan)	5	(0)
2017	→ Paulista (loan)	6	(2)
2017	→ Caldense (loan)	3	(0)
Total		37	(2)
- * Club domestic league appearances and goals

Adelino da Silva Pereira Cirqueira (born 6 July 1994), known as Adelino, is a Brazilian former professional footballer who played as a forward.

== Career ==
=== Guarani ===
Adelino made his league debut for Gurani against Paraná on 28 August 2012.

=== São Paulo ===
Adelino made his league debut for São Paulo against Mogi Mirim on 21 April 2013.

=== Noroeste ===
Adelino made his league debut for Noroeste against Independente SP on 7 March 2014.

=== Portimonese ===
Adelino made his league debut for Portimonese against Feirense on 31 August 2014.

=== Batatais ===
He signed for Batatais. Adelino made his league debut for Batatais against Paulista on 12 March 2016.

=== Paulista ===
Adelino made his league debut for Paulista against Independente SP on 18 March 2017. He scored his first goal for the club against Comercial on 5 April 2017, scoring in the 53rd minute.

=== Caldense ===
Adelino signed for Caldense on loan in 2017. He made his league debut for the club against Espírito Santo on 3 June 2017.
