= Baiano people =

Povo Baiano
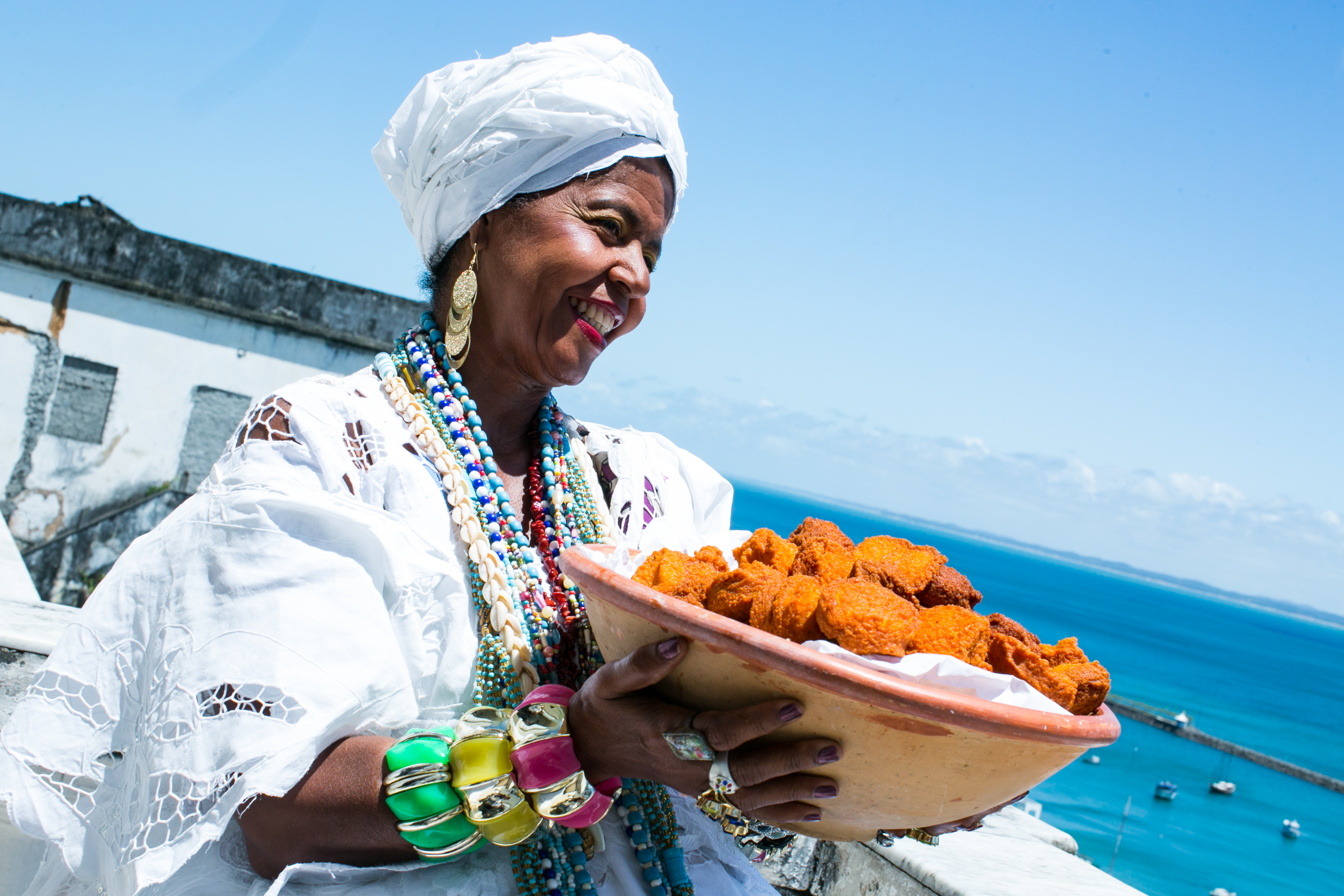
- Baiana woman in Salvador, Bahia, 2015

Total population
- c. 8-10 million (2022)

Regions with significant populations
- Brazil

Languages
- Portuguese, Baiano dialect

Religion
- Predominantly Roman Catholic, minority Protestant and Afro-Brazilian religions

Related ethnic groups
- Portuguese, Yorubas, Igbo, Kongo, Sertanejos, Tupinambás, Akans

The Baianos (Natively: [bɐjˈɐ̃nu(s)]) are a Brazilian ethnocultural group distributed across the coastal regions of Bahia, the northeast of Minas Gerais and the north of Espiríto Santo. They originated from the late 16th to early 17th century from the adaptation of Portuguese immigrants to the tropical climate of Brazil and heavy cultural influence from Africans that were brought to the region as slaves during the transatlantic slave trade. Their population is estimated to be roughly 8 to 10 million people.

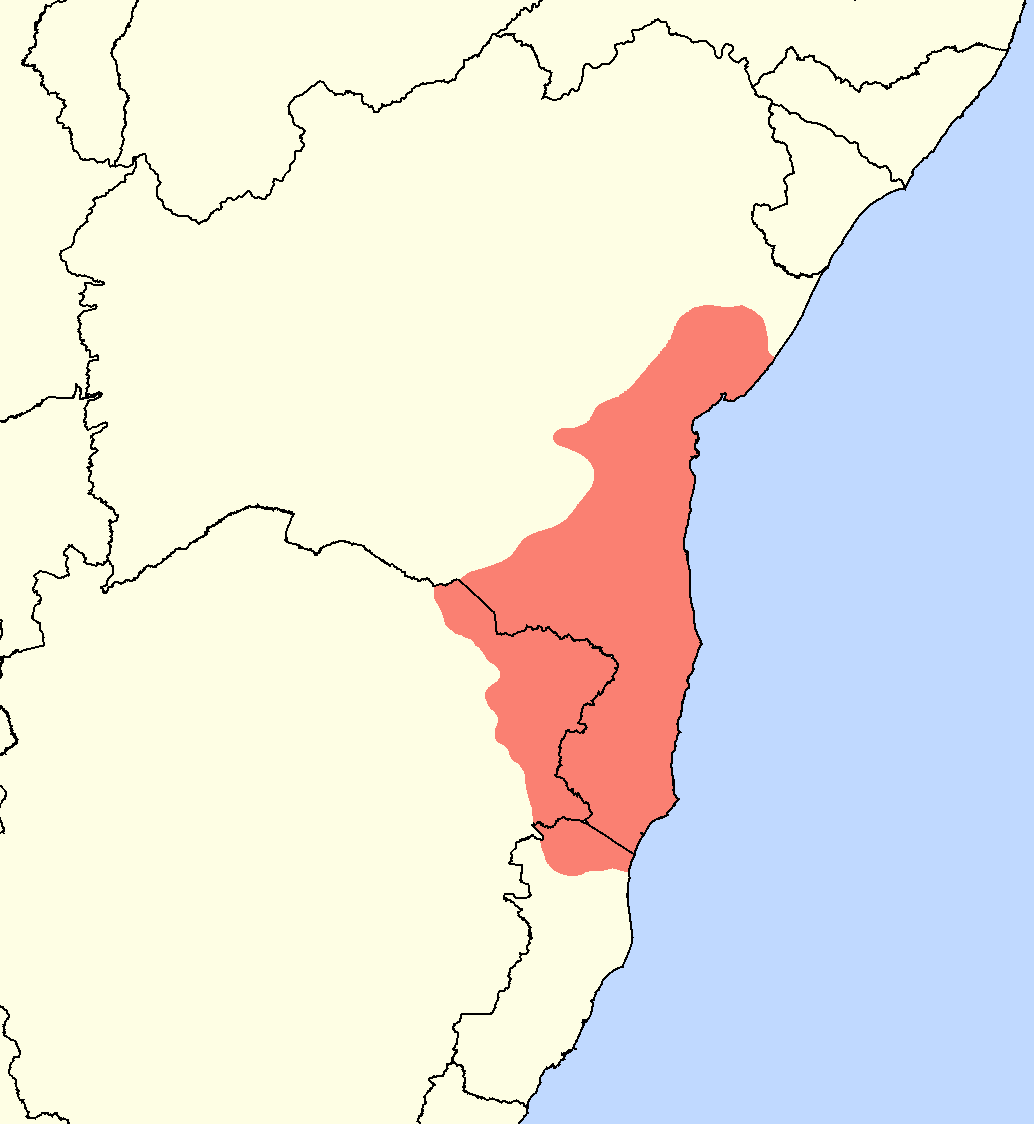
Area inhabited by the Baianos (red) over a map of central eastern Brazil

== Culture ==
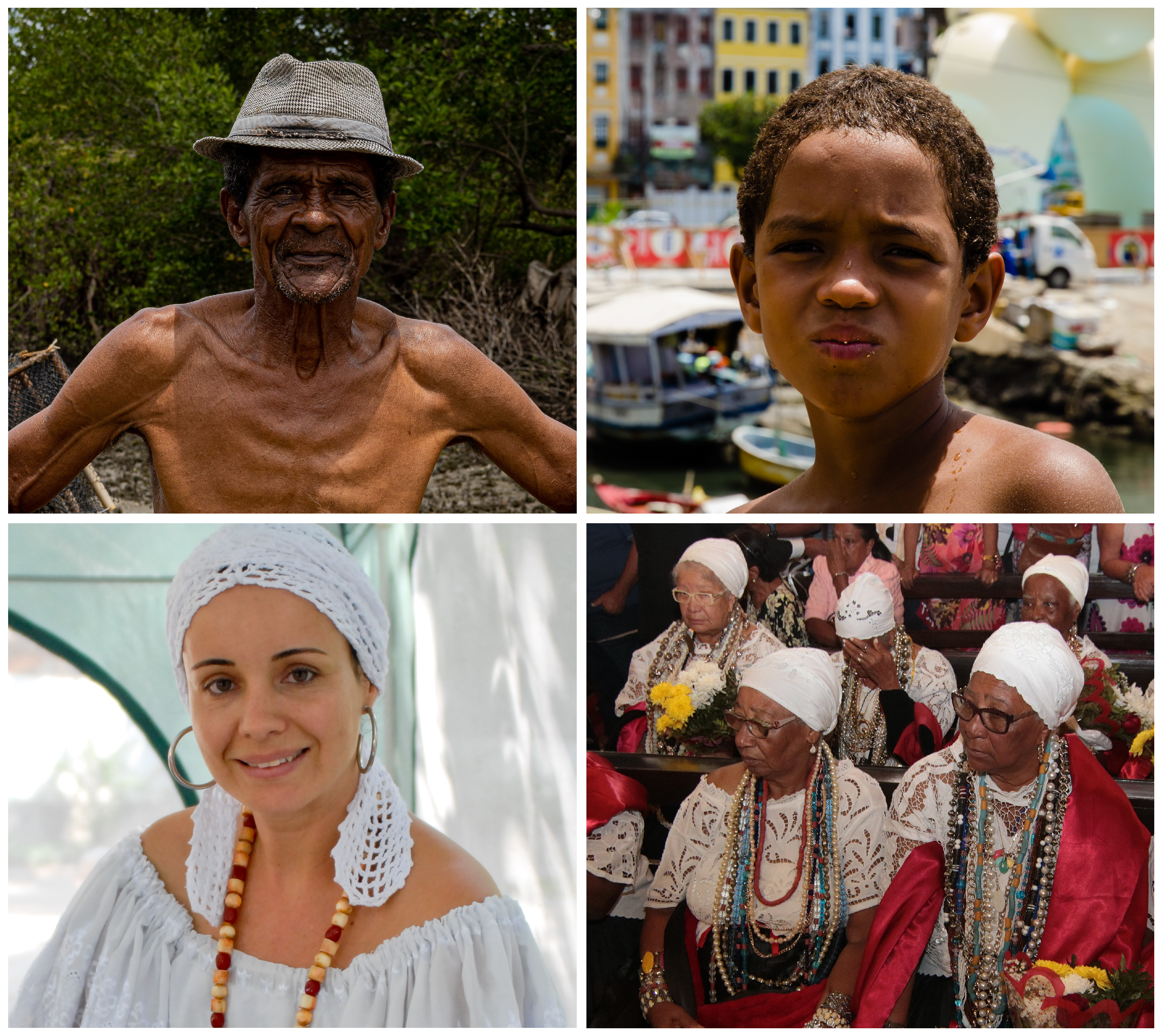
Baianos of varied ages and genders.

The Baiano people have one of the most easily identifiable cultures among the Brazilians, with a higher degree of influence from cultures of modern-day Nigeria and West Africa in general. Traditional Baiano clothing for women include voluminous white dresses, white headwear made of the same fabric as the dresses and the use of many necklaces, rings, bracelets and earrings.

Baiano cuisine is based on beans, rice, fish, shrimps and other seafood. Dishes from the coast of Bahia are spicier and more seasoned than those of the rest of the country, a culinary tradition inherited from the cuisine of the Yoruba people in Nigeria. Traditional Baiano dishes include acarajé, abará, bobó de camarão, moqueca baiana, caruru, xinxim, vatapá, cocada, beiju and doce de banana.

The majority of Baianos are Roman Catholic, numbering at around 50 to 55%, followed by Protestants at 25 to 30%, irreligious people at 15 to 20% and followers of afro-Brazilian religions at 1 to 2%. Despite the low numbers, the traditions and practices of afro-Brazilian religions such as candomblé and umbanda have influenced Baiano culture to an incredible degree, mainly through syncretism with Catholicism.

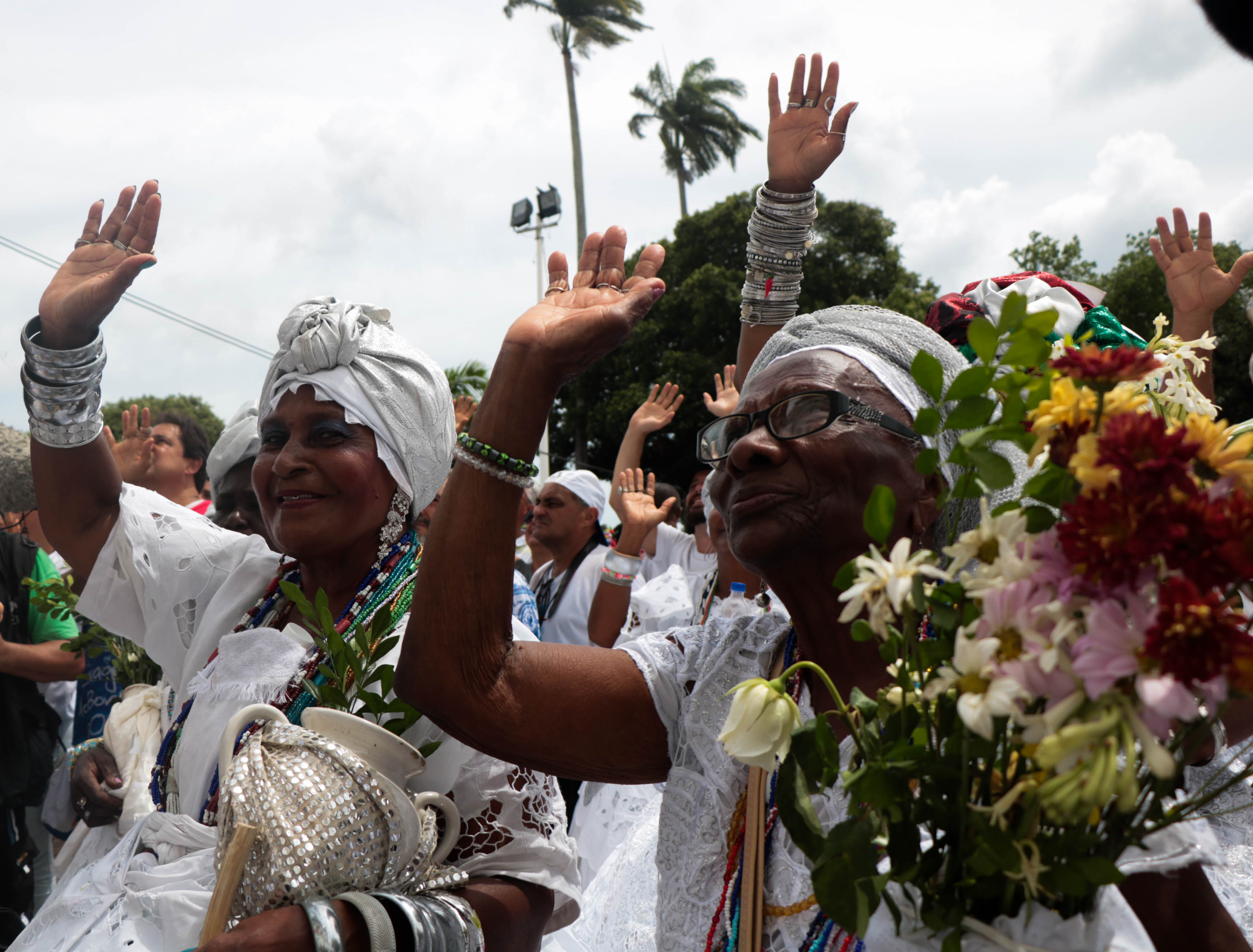
Baianas in the Senhor do Bonfim festivity, a Catholic celebration with syncretic characteristics. Salvador, 2017.

== Genetics ==
According to the 2022 census the coastal area of Bahia is the region of Brazil with the highest concentration of self-identified black people, with the overall Baiano population being around 25 to 35% black, 50 to 60% pardo, and 10 to 15% white.

Genetically, Baianos have the highest proportion of Subsaharan African ancestry among all the Brazilian ethnocultural groups. A 2019 systematic scoping reveal of 51 genetic studies put the autosomal ancestries of Baianos from Salvador as being 52% European, 40% African and 7% Amerindian; samples from Ilhéus, further south in the state of Bahia, put their ancestry at 61% European, 31% African and 7% Amerindian; and the ancestry of Jequié at 44% European, 42% African and 11% Amerindian.

== Notable baianos ==
- Caetano Veloso - musician
- Carlinhos Brown - singer
- Irmã Dulce - Catholic saint
- Gilberto Gil - singer
- Vampeta - footballer
- Gal Costa - singer
- Raul Seixas - singer
- Jorge Amado - writer
- Ruy Barbosa - politician
- Lázaro Ramos - actor
- Dante - footballer
- Maria Quitéria - lieutenant
- Magno Malta - politician
- Daniela Mercury - singer
- Leo Santana - singer
- Bebeto - footballer
