= Adelino Fontoura =

Brazilian actor

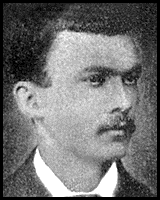
- A photograph of Fontoura
- Born: Adelino Fontoura Chaves; March 30, 1859; Axixá, Brazil
- Died: May 2, 1884 (aged 25); Lisbon, Portugal
- Occupations: Poet, actor, journalist
- Writing career
- Movement: Parnassianism

Adelino Fontoura Chaves (March 30, 1859 – May 2, 1884) was a Brazilian poet, actor and journalist. He is the patron of the 1st chair of the Brazilian Academy of Letters.

== Life ==
Adelino Fontoura was born in the city of Axixá, in Maranhão, to Antônio Fontoura Chaves and Francisca Dias Fontoura.

Since childhood, he had a close friendship with the future author Artur Azevedo.

Moving to Recife, he would work at the satirical journal Os Xênios. Returning to Maranhão, he initiated his artistical career, performing in a play that would make him arrested. After this incident, he moved to Rio de Janeiro.

He tried the artistic and the journalistic career, failing in the first one. He wrote for journals Folha Nova, O Combate and A Gazetinha, where he published some poems and works in prose — and, in this last one, he would collaborate once more with Azevedo, who was its founder. Alongside Ferreira de Menezes, Augusto Ribeiro, Hugo Leal and João de Almeida, he would work for the journal A Gazeta da Tarde, that was, according to Múcio Leão, "one of the most ill-fated journals ever founded", because its founders would die in the next three years after the journal's existence.

After the Gazeta da Tarde was bought by José do Patrocínio, Adelino becomes its correspondent in Paris. Already very sick, his situation got worse due to the harsh French winter, what made him move to Lisbon in an unsuccessful attempt to get better.

He died with only 25 years, without publishing any book.

== Work ==
As mentioned above, Fontoura's work is very sparse, as he did not published anything during his lifetime. Attempts of compiling his poetry were made during the 1940s and 1950s by Múcio Leão.

His most well-known poem is the sonnet "Celeste".

Portuguese language

É tão divina a angélica aparência
E a graça que ilumina o rosto dela
Que eu concebera o tipo de inocência
Nessa criança imaculada e bela.

Peregrina do céu, pálida estrela,
Exilada na etérea transparência,
Sua origem não pode ser aquela
Da nossa triste e mísera existência.

Tem a celeste e ingênua formosura
E a luminosa auréola sacrossanta
De uma visão do céu, cândida e pura.

E quando os olhos para o céu levanta,
Inundados de mística doçura,
Nem parece mulher — parece santa.

English

It is so divine her angelic appearance
And the grace that enlightens her face
That I conceived the kind of innocence
On this pure and immaculate child.

Pilgrim of the skies, O pale star,
Exiled in ethereal transparency,
Your origin can't be the same
Of our sad and miserable existence.

She has the celestial and naïve beauty
And the bright sacrosanct halo
Of a candid and pure celestial vision.

And when she raises her eyes to the sky,
Filled of mystic sweetness,
She doesn't looks like a woman — she looks like a saint.

Preceded by New creation	Brazilian Academy of Letters - Patron of the 1st chair	Succeeded by Luís Murat (founder)
