= North coast Portuguese =

Portuguese dialect of Ceará, Brazil

North coast dialect
- Dialeto da costa norte
- Pronunciation: Portuguese pronunciation: [dʒiaˈlɛtu da ˈkɔstɐ ˈnɔʁtʃi]
- Native to: North and northwest of Ceará, north of Piauí and northeast of Maranhão
- Ethnicity: Sertanejos and Maranhenses
- Native speakers: c. 13 million (2022)
- Language family: Indo-European: Italic; Latin; Romance; Western; Ibero-Romance; West Iberian; Galician-Portuguese; Portuguese; Vernacular Brazilian; North coast dialect

Language codes
- ISO 639-3: –
- Glottolog: None
- Linguasphere: 51-AAA-am
- IETF: pt-BR-u-sd-brce
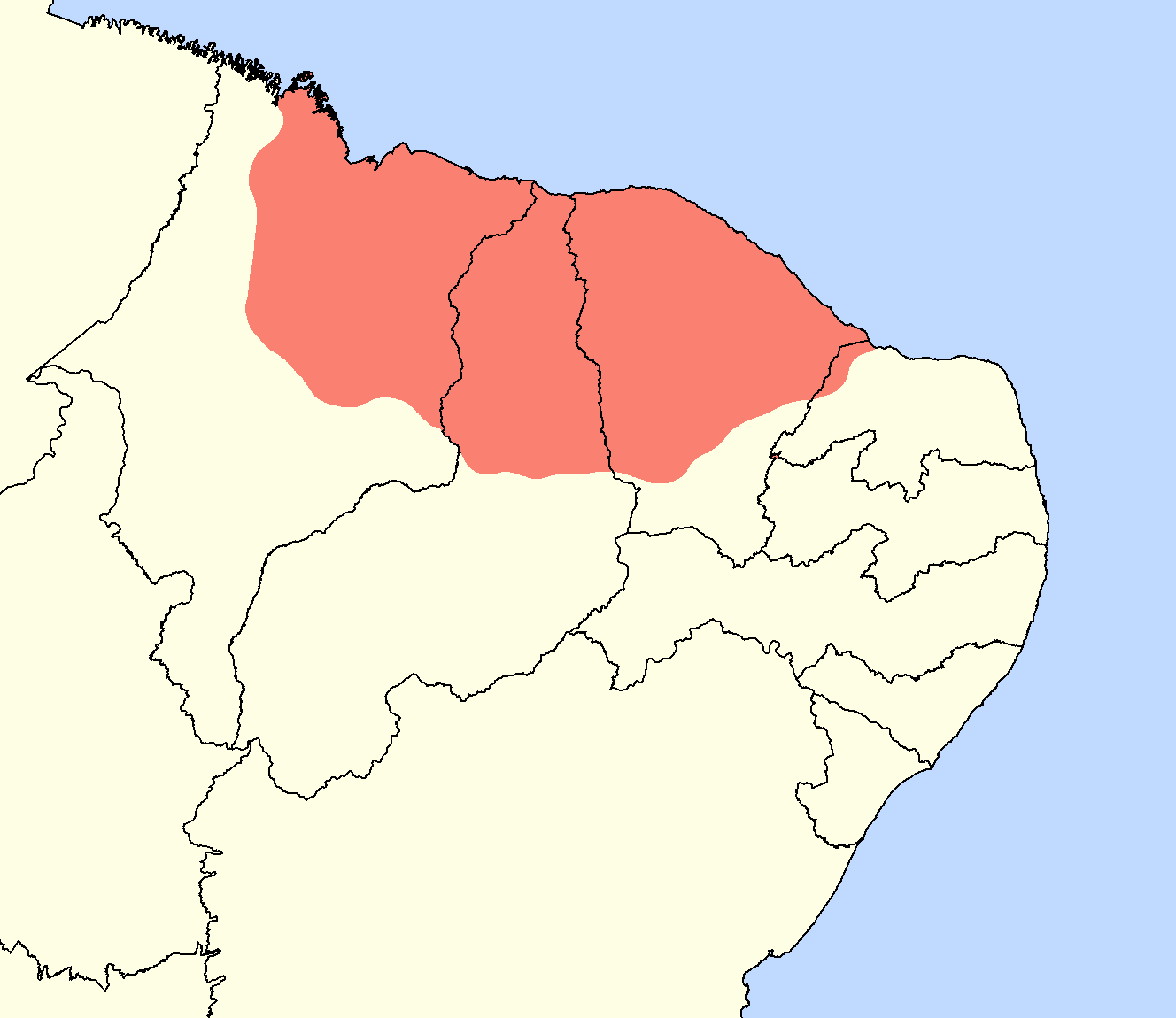
- Approximate range of the Costa Norte dialect over a map of northeastern Brazil.

North coast dialect (Portuguese: dialeto da costa norte, pronounced [dʒiaˈlɛtu da ˈkɔstɐ ˈnɔʁtʃi]), also called Cearense dialect, is a dialect of Portuguese in the Brazilian state of Ceará, having many internal variations, like in the regions Jaguaribe and Sertões (back-countries).

== Main characteristics ==
- Preference for the pronoun tu instead of você (both meaning "you"), without distinction of formal and informal speech.
- Opening of pre-tonic vowels [e] and [o] to [ɛ] and [ɔ], but always obeying a rule of vowel harmony.
- Lenition of [ʎ] and [ɲ] to [j], and reduction of syllables that have these phonemes, represented in Portuguese by ⟨lh⟩ and ⟨nh⟩ respectively.
- Stronger or low "r" sound, depending on their syllabic position (generally strong at the beginning and middle of words, and weak final syllables). Word-finally it is not pronounced.
- Heightening of [e, ẽ] to [i, ĩ] and [o, õ] to [u, ũ].
- Palatalization of fricatives [s, z] to [ʃ, ʒ] when adjacent to letters ⟨t⟩ or ⟨d⟩.
- In Fortaleza and metropolitan area, Ceará North and Ceará Northeast, and close hinterland regions, this group there palatalization phonetic, getting affricates to [d͡ʒi] and [t͡ʃi].
- Stronger "r" is realised as [ɦ], and also debuccalization of phonemes [ʒ, v, z] to [ɦ].
- Unique vocabulary is present in this dialect, leading many authors to write books of various dictionaries of such expressions. This, perhaps, is symbolic of the people of Ceará, with their antics and humor. Examples: marminino (indicates surprise or astonishment, admiration), abirobado (something that is crazy).
