= African people =

Umbrella term for people in Africa or of African descent

Flag of Africa, used to identify with a civic nationalist identity of African people

Map of the African continent (green)

African people or Africans are people who belong to any ethnic, racial, or national group with origins in Africa. Today, it primarily refers to people who are from Africa and reside in the continent, as well as the African diaspora.

As of 2024, Africa's total population is estimated to be 1.5 billion people. The most populous African country is Nigeria, which has over 237.5 million people as of 2025.

== Population of Africa ==
Over 150 different ethnic groups are known to reside in Africa. In 2024, it was reported that 43 million African migrants live outside the country of their birth. In a 2020 report, New South Institute reported that Africa was hosting over 25 million international migrants.

Nigeria, which has a total population of 237.5 million, is the most populous country in Africa, followed by Ethiopia with 135 million.

== African diaspora ==
Brazil is home to the largest African diaspora population, with between 20 million and 112 million people of full or partial African descent as of 2022. (Note: In the 2022 Brazilian census, 20,656,458 Brazilians self-identified as preto (black), while 92,083,286 identified as pardo (brown), a category that designates individuals of mixed racial ancestry. There is debate over whether all pardos have African ancestry. While some pardos may have mixed heritage without African descent, this is considered marginal as the majority have some degree of African ancestry.) The United States has the second-largest African diaspora population, with 40 million people (including African Americans, Afro-Caribbean immigrants, Afro-Latinos, African immigrants) as of 2020.

== See also ==
- Asian people
- European people
- Indigenous peoples of the Americas
- Indigenous peoples of Oceania
